Oddworld Inhabitants Inc. is an American video game, film and television company founded in 1994 by special-effects and computer-animation veterans Sherry McKenna and Lorne Lanning. The company is primarily known for the Oddworld, series of video games about the fictional planet of Oddworld and its native creatures. The series debuted with Oddworld: Abe's Oddysee in 1997 and continued with Oddworld: Munch's Oddysee in 2001 but the studio has also developed standalone titles Oddworld: Abe's Exoddus in 1998 and Oddworld: Stranger's Wrath in 2005.

Oddworld Inhabitants took a break from game development for a time following the release of Stranger's Wrath, even though it had already begun preliminary work on its next Oddworld title, The Brutal Ballad of Fangus Klot. However, it remained an active, operating company during this period, primarily through the development of a movie called Citizen Siege, though to this day it has not been released.

The company returned to the video game industry with UK-based developer Just Add Water in resurrecting the Oddworld franchise through remastering existing titles and developing new ones. In the March 2011, Lorne Lanning confirmed that a high definition rebuild of the studio's first game, was being developed by Just Add Water, called Oddworld: New 'n' Tasty! It was released for PlayStation 4 on 22 July 2014, 25 February 2015 for PC, Mac and Linux, 27 March 2015 for Xbox One, 21 April 2015 for PlayStation 3, 19 January 2016 for PlayStation Vita, and 11 February 2016 for the Wii U. On 14 March 2016, Oddworld Inhabitants announced their next title, Oddworld: Soulstorm, with a release aim of 2018. The release date has been pushed back to 2019, then again to 2020 and then finally 2021, with an official release date of April 6, 2021 for PlayStation 4, PlayStation 5 and the Epic Games Store

History

Independent era

Founding
Founded in 1994, Oddworld Inhabitants came from the partnership between Lorne Lanning and Sherry McKenna.  When he was introduced to 3D computer graphics in the 1980s, he fell in love with this new form of art and tried desperately to find work in an industry where the work was being done "only in a few companies around the world." While studying at the School of Visual Arts in New York City, and then the California Institute of the Arts, Lanning had gained experience working on an aerospace computer program, which was noticed by TRW Aerospace, who offered him the position of Technical Director at the TRW Engineering Visualization Lab in California. He used his BFA in character animation to enter Hollywood and work on feature films and advertisements for visual effects studio Rhythm and Hues, where he met Sherry McKenna. McKenna, CEO of Oddworld Inhabitants, came from a rich family and perfect childhood to become a successful producer and Hollywood executive in computer animation. Lanning described her as "the 'go to' person in computer graphics... and a pioneering producer in visual effects" who had the know-how and power in business to make things happen, and the first person he met in Hollywood that would cut to the chase and be direct about what she thought of something. In 1991, Lanning and McKenna started to work together on computer animation rights.

In 1992, Lanning began posing the idea of starting Oddworld Inhabitants with McKenna. After working with 3D animation in films and television, he correctly predicted that they would be integrated into video games, exploding the medium into the future. When he had heard the rumour of a new gaming console called the PlayStation, he asked McKenna if she would partner with him in starting a company by combining her skills in business and the film industry with his knowledge in computer graphics animation. He showed her Doom running on a PC, but McKenna was initially not very receptive to the idea, believing games to be "ugly and confusing," and liking Lanning's story of Abe for a movie rather than a video game. Lanning explained that it was an economic connection they needed to make because the medium was ready to take off, and that they could be the Cecil B. DeMilles of video games. After two years of convincing, and hearing Lanning tell his story of Abe she eventually agreed to go along, but "he had to come up with the start-up money", Lanning went out and presented his idea for what would later become Oddworld: Abe's Oddysee, and discovered two things worked in his favour: his time in aerospace technology made him the only developer with any experience in 3D computer animation at a time when the video game industry was ready to enter the 3D computer animation landscape; and the venture capitalist investors were responsive to "hearing that someone would be approaching content in a more filmic storytelling, deeply character driven way." They were inexperienced in the gaming industry, which allowed him to get away with a story that otherwise would not have been accepted. Lanning returned to McKenna with three and a half million dollars that he borrowed based on his 3D expertise, and they moved from Hollywood to San Luis Obispo in September 1994, where Oddworld Inhabitants was started.

Video game development era (1997–2005)

Oddworld: Abe's Oddysee (1997)

The first game to come out of Oddworld Inhabitants, Inc. was 1997's Oddworld: Abe's Oddysee, a 2D side-scrolling platform game published by GT Interactive for PlayStation and PC. Despite Lanning borrowing money to start the company based on his 3D expertise, he chose to develop a 2D platform game. He saw that the quality of 3D on the gaming systems at the time were poor, so his expertise went into pre-rendering 3D bitmaps because the unique look would distinguish them from all other games being produced in 3D at the time. They used flip screens to make a flip book effect, with the pre-rendered bitmaps like digital paintings used as the background on each screen. Production began in January 1995 with the original title SoulStorm before GT Interactive changed the name in September 1996 and released it on 19 September 1997. The game proved to be a commercial and critical hit, sold 3.5 million units, made $180 million and won nearly 30 industry media awards. The game tells the story of Abe, one of 100 mudokon creatures enslaved by industrialist glukkon creatures in a meat-processing plant called RuptureFarms on the planet Oddworld. When the glukkons find that the wildlife used to create their meat products are becoming extinct, they decide to use the mudokons in their next product, forcing Abe to escape the plant and rescue his friends.

Described as "mysticism versus consumerism with a mega dose of twisted humor," the story represented beliefs deep and personal to creator Lorne Lanning—that "great art reflects back on us not necessarily what we want to see, but what we need to face." For Lanning, those beliefs infused his characterisation of the planet Oddworld, with Abe's Oddysee touching on just a small aspect of the larger picture that was the entire planet. His idea was for the theme of Oddworld to be "heavily woven with the dark side of globalization, the dark side of the multi-national fallout upon the human condition" and for his games to touch on examples of those themes, in the case of Abe's Oddysee, capitalism, third-world exploitation, the environment and the fast food industry with respect to the plight of the diamond miners in South Africa and the De Beers cartel that dominate diamond trading. Lanning disliked "what [capitalism] did to the little guy," and "wanted to create a meaningful dark reflection of our dysfunctional world, wrapped up in a fantasy world, where we could talk about the craziness of our capitalism, but with a funny bone approach." And this anti-capitalist view infused the deeper meaning of Abe's Oddysee as the socio-economic element of the story was set amongst the lower class "slaving away in unsafe conditions, unwillingly bending to the will of corporate suits... to earn a few bucks for a day's worth of grueling, often unrewarding work" The protagonist fighting back against his oppressors, the Glukkons, represented Lanning's desire for people in the real world to fight back against the "abominable behavior of the world's most greedy multi-national corporations," characterised by "caricatures of CEOs, all power-suits and cigars." The Glukkons play a minor role in the gameplay of Abe's Oddysee, and are only seen in the game's cutscenes. This was intentional, as Lanning wanted the primary antagonist to be the RuptureFarms factory itself. "The corporation is above and beyond any of its executives or employees—or slaves. So by making [players] defeat RuptureFarms as the end boss... we thought it would add a bigger sense of climax." This story was important to Lanning because he feels "it's the artist's role to create new myths that are relevant to the changing times of our world, [and] to bring some shining direction to our more troubling challenges."

The game introduced what would become staple features of Oddworld games. In an era of gaming when protagonists were typically muscle-bound, imposing and carrying a weapon, Abe was the complete antithesis of that.
Lanning said he wanted his protagonists to represent the everyman, the average chump, so they're not the "steroided out, muscle-bound heroes you want to be, they're the poor schumucks you actually are," so as to better symbolize the Average Joe that is exploited unknowingly by corporations. Oddworld's senior animator Scott Easley said Abe is "not a brainiac, he's not a jack of all trades, he's not a master anything, he's a goofbag... but he's indicative of a much greater world that's out there." Lanning explained the process of designing and characterising Abe involved an American meat institute promo, Pakistani chuhas, and "classic American misinformation" given to "seriously troubled production designers." Being a character that Sherry McKenna described as one that "people could really identify with, not the character we'd like to be," Abe could not carry a weapon. "The biggest problem was, if Abe could carry a gun, then general gaming behavior means that he's going to start solving all his problems with a gun, and that was not the Abe we wanted to create." Instead, Lanning wanted the hero to be empathetically driven, and he believed "It was a message that was really ready to be heard by the executive class in the industry". The only problem was that video games did not have mechanics to suit a character who fought with emotion and speech instead of guns. So they developed those mechanics, in the form of gamespeak and possession. Possession came from Lanning's desire to make Abe's mudokon creatures Shamanic by the way of being connected to the spiritual world—an antithesis to the antagonist Glukkons who were industrialists. This gave Abe the ability to chant in order to possess the mind and body of Slig guards, using them to sneak past areas undetected, carry out tasks he could not do himself, or kill with their machine guns.

The second staple of Oddworld games, and what would be Abe's other weapon—gamespeak—was a feature of the game that allowed Abe to communicate with other Mudokons in order to instruct them to safety and rescue. Lanning described gamespeak as "a way to try to have meaningful verbal action that would also create a closer connection... to our characters... a necessary ingredient designed to make you care more for the Mudokons you were supposed to rescue." What Lanning found throughout the history of games was that they mostly followed the same paradigm:

And by giving Abe the ability to communicate and feel emotions for the characters he saved or lost, it made him "the guy that in our hearts, we identify with... why we care so much for him." One of the engines created and trademarked by Oddworld Inhabitants for Oddysee was the Aware Lifeforms in Virtual Entertainment (A.L.I.V.E) engine. Lanning views it as "a conceptual theme more than a technological evolution" that aimed to create virtual characters with believable personalities and visible awareness because, "if characters feel more compelling and self aware—then we increase the possibility of engaging our audience emotionally." Abe was also given an infinite number of lives because "I wanted you to never give up. No matter how fucking sucky you were, if you stuck with it, you'd get there. And that's life, man."

When Abe's Oddysee was released in Japan, two changes were made to the game's visuals, namely during the FMV sequences. The first was due to the graphic image of a severed mudokon head atop a stick in the introductory movie depicting the new "Mudokon Pops" item about to be marketed by the Glukkons, shocking Abe into his escape and thus beginning the game. In the Japanese release, the image of the Mudokon Pops was changed to resemble a cartoonlike Popsicle with eyes and a mouth, considered a "happier" image by Oddworld Inhabitants. It was not until 2011 that Lanning revealed just why the image was changed for Japanese audiences. A week before press was to begin in Japan to market the game, a Japanese middle-school student murdered a peer, severed his head, and hung it on the fence of a school. Lanning saw that this was "very, very distressful to the country of Japan that this happened... so they said that it would probably be a good idea to change it. We were asked and we weren't stupid, so we complied." The altered image remained in the sequel released in all territories. Said Lanning, "I never liked the first one. But that was just what came out from the artists and I... try to give [them] some room and not change everything to my liking."

The second change made to the final Japanese version concerned the appearance of Abe's four-fingered hand. The developers found that in Japan, a hand with four fingers was common amongst "a subclass of meat packing workers that were typically looked down upon in their society." Over time, the displaying of a four-fingered hand gesture towards another came to be seen as an insult implying that they were subclass. To use that in a form of entertainment could "very likely end up in legal battles with a vociferous pressure group" who likened the insult to that of Nazis making Jews wear the yellow badge during World War II. Lanning understood how it might have been distasteful to ignore that part of Japanese culture by leaving Abe with his four fingers, especially considering a large part of the game's setting was in a meat-packing plant. But when he discovered that the group would accept a payment of one million dollars to keep the insulting image in the game, "that becomes extortion, rather than a principle." As a result, Oddworld Inhabitants decided to let the pressure groups have their way by changing the image to give Abe three fingers, so that the developers could maintain their morality in not paying off extortionists. The irony of the controversy was that it was an example of life imitating art, as in the game, Abe was the representative of a subclass of species "discriminated against for being who he was... because they don't like his kind here."

Oddworld: Abe's Exoddus (1998)

The success of Oddysee required Oddworld Inhabitants to make a sequel, which forced them to break from their original plan of a five game "Quintology" with the next game intended to be Oddworld: Munch's Oddysee. In an example of life imitating art, the corporate machine of Oddworld's publishers, GT Interactive, pressured the studio to make a new game for the PlayStation by Christmas 1998. Lorne Lanning refused to make Munch for PlayStation because he wanted that game to use 3D environments and he felt the hardware was not good enough to handle that. The short turnaround between games meant Lanning had to think fast about what game to produce. In order to complete a game in nine months, he decided on a direct sequel to Abe's Oddysee using the same engine, added improvements to gamespeak, a quicksave system, more cinematic sequences and even more intricate backgrounds. Lanning said his studio "killed ourselves getting Abe's Exoddus done in nine months" and McKenna reiterated, "it was hell... not fun... we got it done in nine months because that's what you're supposed to do—deliver on time." A bonus game outside of the original Quintology, Abe's Exoddus released in 1998 for PlayStation and PC, continuing the story where Oddysee left off using elements that were left out of its predecessor due to time constraints. Abe is sent on a quest by his deceased ancestors to destroy the mega factories that produce Soulstorm Brew—a product made from the bones of dead mudokons, and rescue 300 of his kind, discovering an even deeper connection to his spiritual past along the way. And like the previous game, "it speaks about hope, it speaks about changing for the better, it speaks about not being beaten down by the big guy."

While Exoddus may not have been in the initial plan, Lanning believes the bonus game worked because they wanted the Oddworld universe to be a franchise with infinite stories:

So while the Quintology was the core focus of Oddworld Inhabitants, bonus games in the same universe were not unwelcome.

One of the adjustments made for Exoddus was the increase in humor compared to Oddysee. While the dark themes of industrialization, exploitation and capitalism were still present, Lanning felt they needed to be offset by more humor. Some of that came in the form of the added ability to possess Abe's own farts and use them as explosives. "We believe in laughs... they make for good entertainment... and it made sense with our super dark themes to give them a lighter heart with more dysfunctional things to do."

Oddworld: Munch's Oddysee (2001)

The studio's third game was Oddworld: Munch's Oddysee, a 3D platform game developed with their upgraded A.L.I.V.E 2 engine and published by Infogrames exclusively for the Microsoft Xbox console. It was the studio's first foray into the 3D gaming landscape. Lanning wanted to raise the bar for the performance of computer graphics in his games and required a larger output from a console, and found the Xbox was the only one capable of his expectations for the game.

Abe returns, this time to assist Munch, the last of the gabbit species on all of Oddworld. His species has been fished to extinction by the Vykkers because their eggs are a delicacy marketed as "gabbiar" for the dominant species on the planet, and Munch seeks to find the last known can of gabbiar eggs in order to revive his species. Like Abe, Munch was the embodiment of the "disturbing, sad reality that's happening in our world today [turned] into a character that people like" in the dysfunctional 21st century. Where Disney "won the 20th century, that's not the future, because kids just don't dig that anymore, we're dealing with different kids... it's a dysfunctional world... if we can embody dysfunctional characters that are really endearing, then we think that's what people are really going to connect with." Munch's conceptualisation came from hundreds of design concepts based on combining imagery of cats in UCLA medical labs and facial cream testing divisions with images of rabbits used in pharmaceutical testing and the "pure evil" of U.S. radiation experiments on unwitting elderly citizens seeking medical assistance. The theme of species extinction came from Lanning's experiences as a child growing up, fishing on the Connecticut river and watching species of fish literally die out due to acid rain and factories built nearby. He wanted Munch to embody loneliness and loss to hit the heart strings of the audience, and as with Abe, he begins the game at the "conceptual position of biggest loser, the most downtrodden, hopeless possible position" because "the Oddworld series is all about big, corporate bullies picking on the little guy," and Lanning wanted "every hero we built on Oddworld [to] come out of that soil," so his story was again couched in "the dark side of globalisation" that would be the basis of all Oddworld stories:

The development of Munch's Oddysee came after the decision by Oddworld Inhabitants to shift from the PC and PlayStation One platforms to Microsoft's new Xbox console. While the fans responded with hate mail, Lanning explained it was both a technological decision, and a survival decision for his company. On the technological front, the studio began developing the game for the PS2, but had two problems—the "unfriendly development environment of the hardware" made it difficult to program for, and the quality of animation was not as good as Lanning wanted it, relative to how much they were spending. However, Lanning saw that the Xbox had the superior graphics capabilities he required to produce the game. It could withstand multiple dozen characters moving and interacting on screen at the same time in the quality of animation they wanted, and with an evolving environmental landscape in the background. "Only Xbox gives us the graphical muscle and intense digital sound to unleash our creative juices and allow us to bring the imaginary world and rich characters of Oddworld to life," said Lanning. For development purposes, the game was made to run on a PC, and being that the Xbox was billed as the PC in a box, the change made sense. And Microsoft's paradigm of being a console for the entire family fit perfectly with their own view of their studio. Microsoft also personally asked Lanning what he wanted a possible console to include before they even begun development on the Xbox, and when he saw the system that they built had included a lot of what he requested, he could see that the development of Munch was now possible.

But the decision to move to Microsoft was as much about his company surviving as it was about the Xbox being the only console to withstand the technological advancements of Munch's Oddysee. Rumours that they were paid to jump to Microsoft were false. With Oddworld's publishers, GT Interactive, about to be sold, Lanning heard from other developers that its buyer, Infogrames, was cutting the budgets of its titles to three million dollars, and for his new game to be projected as costing ten million dollars with a studio operating between 500 and 700 thousand dollars a month, Lanning realised, "this is just not going to work... and that's just common practice in capitalism". The game couldn't be made under that condition, so they needed to find a new publisher, which was when Microsoft expressed interest in publishing their games, but under the condition that they release Munch exclusively for the Xbox. It was a time where money was as important as ever, because unlike the current generation of gaming, developers were not given the tools to build games for the Xbox and PS2; they had to build their own tools first, at a great expense, and wanting Munchs story to be better, while maintaining the soul of Abe's Oddysee and the quality of the Oddworld brand as their mascot had to compete with globally recognised icons like Duke Nukem and Lara Croft, Lanning's company was left with no other option but to choose the console that could withstand its new technologies and afford to lend them the money required to keep it alive in the industry, even if it meant the fans on other platforms would not have access to the game. On 23 October 2000, Microsoft announced the signing of a deal with Infogrames, securing exclusive rights to publishing and distributing the next four Oddworld Inhabitants titles, beginning with Munch's Oddysee the following year. Lanning expressed his regret at leaving the PC platform, but Microsoft refused to agree to a PC version of the game, and "unless you're going to pay for [games] yourself... you have to work with partners" who place constraints on products.

Lanning described Munch's Oddysee as the project that has him the least satisfied. He took responsibility for the game's faults in acknowledging that he was immature, couldn't handle the pressure that went with managing a larger group of 75 developers and was too over-demanding for what became unrealistic goals. Lanning later explained in 2006 that video game developers were being held back creatively by the race to develop newer technologies, a fact that affected the production of Munch because of the change from 2D to 3D that was demanded by the market of the new Xbox. The team working on Munch's Oddysee was the same team that produced Abe's Oddysee and Exoddus, and thus they had no experience in 3D game development. In the case of the 2D Abe games, the backgrounds were paintings processed into sprites, pre-rendered and photo retouched, allowing them to add much more detail that wasn't possible in the 3D environment of Munch's Oddysee. Three months from release, the team realised that development was not going to be complete in time, so "four or five" new programmers were brought in and replaced most of the development team, who re-wrote the entire game in nine months. As for the increase in humor and its "cartoony" style, Lanning explained that Microsoft thought of the Oddworld franchise as its Super Mario Bros..

Gilray revealed the failure of Munch left the team heartbroken. Lanning felt that they, and in particular he, under-delivered on the promise of this new game, and for the first time since before Abe's Oddysee, he felt a sense of vulnerability in the industry. It was a "turbulent time in the industry" with publishers going in and out of business, budgets rising and publishers and developers still learning to manage the changes," but the biggest factor that worried Lanning was the exposure brought about by Microsoft's Xbox console. Munch's Oddysee was one of the launch titles for the Xbox alongside Halo, and with the visibility that came from being in the spotlight at the console's launch, there was nowhere to hide when it was dwarfed by Halo.

In October 2017, Lanning revealed that he was approached by a film producer with ties to J. J. Abrams during the production of Munch's Oddysee. He admits he never read the treatment that they made, and blames the missed opportunity on the demanding nature of the video game industry at the time.

Oddworld: Stranger's Wrath (2005)

For their fourth game, originally a sequel to Munch's Oddysee, Oddworld Inhabitants entered new territory. Previously titled, 'Oddworld Stranger: Wrath of the Wild,' Stranger's Wrath was unique to the three previous Oddworld games on three fronts. Firstly, the game shifts between the first-person shooter perspective and third-person action-adventure in order to take advantage of the game's combat and platforming elements. The interchangeability of the two styles was described as natural, well-executed, and the best of both gaming worlds. The other new element about this entry in the Oddworld series is that it was the first game to feature a whole new part of Oddworld, and without the studio's mascot Abe. In a Western setting inspired by the works of Sergio Leone, the player assumes the role of Stranger, the last of a seemingly extinct species called the Steef. He embodied everything that Abe did not—strength, speed, ruthlessness and the use of weapons. IGN described the new elements as a welcome change that showed the Oddworld franchise and Lorne Lanning's ability as a designer had the ability to adapt and evolve with the times after what it described as the failure of Munch's Oddysee. The last of the game's new elements concerned the live ammunition made available to the player. Lanning explained that he wanted to give fans a new reason to enjoy a first-person shooter that went beyond the simple choice of "do I shoot 'em in the knee or do I shoot 'em in the head," so the ammunition within the game came in the form of living creatures possessing their own AI, meaning each would respond differently and cause a unique effect when shot from the player's crossbow. The change in setting and style also allowed for a different kind of storytelling, as it begins with a steady pace of Stranger bounty hunting to save "moolah" to pay for lifesaving surgery before evolving "into a touching tale of redemption that complements Abe's own adventures" in a shift that increases the game's drama and pace in the final hours. During development, there were tests to add multiplayer to the game, which would have been another first for the franchise, but that never eventuated.

But some of the traditional Oddworld elements that originally made the brand unique returned. Most notably, the artificial intelligence of Oddworld's species, as governed by their A.L.I.V.E. game engine, evolved from the Munch iteration to create a more "believable personality and visible awareness". For example, how the player treats the local townsfolk, Clakkerz, dictates how they in turn treat the player. "They will hide if you hurt them and... will also help you out if are nice about it... [so] playing with the locals is half the fun in this game." The creatures are also the "perfect example of what Oddworld previously did so well—infuse weird-looking characters with spunk, attitude and humor". The way in which the cutscenes intertwine seamlessly with the gameplay in order to convey the story is another element from previous games that returns in Stranger.

Stranger's Wrath was released in January 2005, like its predecessor, exclusively for Microsoft's Xbox console. Despite the game being well-received by critics, it was not commercially successful, selling only 600,000 units. But the quality of the game was not the main reason for its lack of success, as its sandbox-style combat and shifting between first and third-person perspectives was considered a legitimate rival to Halo. According to Lanning, the game "wasn't advertised or marketed because Electronic Arts couldn't get its PlayStation 2 port of our Xbox original to run and if EA isn't on all SKUs, it just won't promote the game." Of the decision, Lanning said:

Suggestions that he was disillusioned with EA Games for their decision to cut Stranger's marketing and advertising budget were initially refuted by Lanning, stating he had no ill feelings towards EA Games, but simply realized the finances and the deals in the industry were not conducive to the big plans he and McKenna had when they first founded the studio. After several years passed, Lanning revisited the issue and claimed EA games "sabotaged" Stranger's Wrath with its marketing decisions, explaining no matter how good a game can be, its fate is decided by the publisher's marketing commitment. And with a new IP like Stranger in a retail climate, its success was only possible if it had the visibility that comes with advertising. For a game that was a commercial failure in 2005, it went number one for the Vita in the U.K. and Europe and number two in the US as soon as the remaster was released seven years later in 2012.

Citizen Siege era (2005–2009)

"Solomon's Baby"
The Stranger's Wrath marketing issues between Oddworld Inhabitants and EA Games left Lorne Lanning with a cynical view of the relationship between publishers and video game development studios such as his own. When the sales for his games declined, EA told him it was due to his brand depreciating and losing its value in the eyes of the consumer, so they offered to acquire the company. At a point in the video game development age where budgets were rising along with the sales aims to fund those budgets, "big publishers didn't want to have anything to do with you if they couldn't own your IP... you would basically have these deals where if you wanted to sign a $15 million development deal you were simultaneously signing an acquisition deal." whereby the publisher has the clause to buy the development company at the value before its success." But Lanning saw that the most successful creators, such as Jim Henson, Dr. Seuss and Disney, did not sell their "children" off to the "foster home," but instead held on to them for life, and were fiercely "protective of the idea that these creations should sustain... and at Oddworld, we were kind of looking at it that way" And he did not want to have any part of those deals because it would see development studios divided like "Solomon's Baby", with each corporate faction that had a stake in the studio would claim ownership and then take a slice of it, leaving the original studio destroyed. But this baby belonged to Lanning and Sherry McKenna, and "we didn't want to sell... we didn't want to give the characters to a foster home". They saw EA Games' offer to acquire Oddworld Inhabitants as "not a sustainable model, [but] a hostile acquisition" and was met with Lanning and McKenna's stern refusal.

After the release of Stranger's Wrath, Lanning initiated a case to audit the publishing deal his company maintained, with respect to royalties, and it was discovered that there were "millions and millions of dollars of error not in our favour," and chose to give EA an ultimatum of paying the money or giving back 100% of his company and all its associated IPs, the latter resulting. Unfortunately, ditching their publisher came at a cost—the loss of finance for game development, marketing and distribution. Without being able to fund it themselves, Oddworld Inhabitants could not continue to produce games. At the time, the studio had begun work on a new game called The Brutal Ballad of Fangus Klot, though it was working under the constraints of an Xbox-exclusive engine at a time when Microsoft only supported developers working on the Xbox 360.

Oddworld closes its doors

In April 2005, Lanning announced the studio's decision to cancel all projects and leave the video game industry. The decision left audiences and the gaming media confused and thinking the decision was based on Lanning's anger with EA Studios for the marketing issues of Stranger's Wrath. Even one former employee could not grasp their decision, saying "quite honestly they had one of the best teams in the industry, and they just threw it away." So Lanning explained the very next day that the decision was not "a result of emotional reactions to the industry or Stranger's release." They closed the studio because the financing models where the publisher provides the funds for the studio meant the publisher could dictate the kinds of marketing decisions like the one made by EA to cut Stranger's marketing. In addition, the trend of expectation versus success during Oddworld's time in game development showed a cycle with which Lanning was not willing to continue. He explained that when they developed their first game, the sales expectation was only half of what they were able to deliver, but for the second game, the sales expectation was almost twice as much as what they could deliver, and for the third and fourth games, the sales expectations again increased while the actual sales further decreased. But he explained that the reason for their diminishing successes were due to what he refers to as FUBARS—elements beyond the control of the developers, but influence the production, distribution and publishing of the games—that begun very low during the development of their first game but increased by up to five times as much by the time the fourth game was being developed:

 
The industry had become so risk-averse, that publishers were not willing to invest large amounts of money on projects that are not proven long-term successes. Under these conditions, Lanning found he could no longer continue in the video game industry, because he had bigger plans for the Oddworld brand. When he and McKenna first created Oddworld Inhabitants, they described themselves as a property development company, not a technology company. During the marketing stage of Munch's Oddysee, Lanning explained that Oddworld Inhabitants always looked at video games as "the place to birth the property of Oddworld," but the games were written in treatment form as though they're motion pictures because "part of our dream is to make one of the big movies." While the first step involved a video game development studio building technology that would run their critically and commercially successful games, it was not their ultimate goal. The success of their first game became the company's undoing, as their publisher demanded a quick follow-up, and they were eventually bogged down in game development, leaving them hamstrung when it came to achieving the company's next goal. So to reach that goal, the next phase of the studio's development began with focusing on the core of why they started the studio back in 1994:

In short, the plan was to switch to a "Hollywood movie production model: find the funds, plan the game, then freelance the work out," though it meant starting at the bottom financially. Lanning and McKenna closed the company's internal game production in San Luis Obispo and began looking at business models beyond that of the standard publisher/developer model. The aim was to fund the development of IPs on a range of media wider than just video games. The timing was right, according to Lanning, to start applying the lessons they learned from game development "about demographics and understanding your audience" to the film landscape. And he felt the future of entertainment production was going to be about tailoring projects for the convergence of media in the form of TV and film, where he first started his professional life, in addition to video game production. "Next-gen IP development, in our opinion, is really Massively Multi-Media Property development, of which games are one outlet" and "as we head deeper into the 21st century... film, television, and interactive design will continue to grow more intertwined." The intent became to make CG material for film, television and gaming that would relate to and inform each other, while letting third-party production studios realize their next-gen game concepts.

Lanning gave this new venture a limited time to get up and running, saying, "If we don't crack it in the next two-and-a-half years, we're not going to be able to," but was confident "there's a window that's open for all-CG feature films and TV."

"Citizen Siege" and "Wage Wars"

There were four projects being worked on in this phase of the Oddworld Inhabitants studio—the only three to become public knowledge were a CG feature film entitled "Citizen Siege", an online video game tied into the film, called "Wage Wars" and an HD machinima series. Citizen Siege was first announced by Lorne Lanning in his keynote speech at GameCity in Nottingham, UK. To be directed by Lanning, executive produced by Sherry McKenna and produced by Vanguard Films, it was to be a dark, political, action thriller with elements of sci-fi set in a universe entirely separate from Oddworld "where current global conditions are extrapolated into a frightening near future where democracy has all but disintegrated under the rule of global corporatism" categorised by nightmarish credit rackets responsible for the hero's predicament. It wasn't until many years later that Lanning would further explain the story of the film. In this dystopia, society has reduced humans to mere commodity, where healthy human tissue is used as collateral against financial debt, allowing corporations to literally re-possess people piece-by-piece. The hero of the story, now encased in a cheap life-support system, sets out to reclaim the pieces of his re-possessed body and take down the organisation responsible for his own harvesting, crossing economic borders with the aid of unworldly powers fused to his mechanical body. Lanning said they wanted to go in a direction different from Disney's adult humor by combining animation with darker stories like Apocalypse Now, Blade Runner, and The Lord of the Rings It was also described as "1984 (sic) for the 21st century". While this story was the first move away from the studio's creation of the fictional Oddworld planet, it would still feature the same attention to graphical detail, while its subject matter would retain the subtext that inspired Oddworld, "except more relative to what's going on today on the political landscape, geographically on the world scale and it's sort of a menacing view of a possible future." Development of the project began with the goal to making a video game, and included a few hundred digital production paintings. The studio ultimately lost faith in their publisher/developer model and did not want to pursue any further relationships with a big publisher, so it never reached a proper pre-production phase. Instead, they began shopping it as a CG animated feature.

According to Lanning in a September 2007 interview, "Wage Wars" was expected to be an online game—the first of two to help promote Citizen Siege. He explained that his studio was not finished with games; they were not running a game development studio anymore but they were holding onto game licensing for the films they were going to make because they wanted to ensure those games were made how they wanted them to be made, without having to do it themselves. The idea was to develop "Wage Wars" and Citizen Siege simultaneously "so that both the linear and interactive elements can launch together." But they did not actively begin looking for game developers. The first goal was to gain the marketing commitment for Citizen Siege, "because films usually have more marketing dollars behind them, and that's how you're really penetrating brand awareness into the world audience," and once that was achieved, the deals for games and television would come easily.

Revealing their objective during this era of the company, Lanning explained that they wanted to "amortize the assets across multiple platforms and really kick machinima into a new level of storytelling and quality." But it became difficult for them to legalize the database rights when film studios, game developers and cable networks wanted to own every piece of production, particularly game publishers who aren't willing to "finance your game that's a new property... then let you go off with the film rights." This is something Lanning wanted to avoid because his view is that the future of entertainment IP is about being cross-platform (in the case of Citizen Siege—the television, film and game platforms), citing Google and Microsoft as an example of how the former is the future because it works across multiple platforms as opposed to the latter which is just one platform. And he was not a fan of franchises with property "led in one medium like a movie or game and then blindly licensed with mediocrity coming out in the other mediums," so their ambition was to birth properties that play well on all of those fronts. But this future of entertainment IP is only possible if it is guided by the people that create it—the ones most passionate about it—because they treat their franchises a lot better than the corporate bureaucracies that tend to just try to milk them on whatever fronts are possible". Said Lanning, "The time for tools and technology is right, the partnership is right, and the audience is ready, so this is the opportunity we've been waiting for to prove if we've got what it takes." At the time that Citizen Siege was being developed, social media and social networking had just begun opening up, digital distribution was coming, and Oddworld Inhabitants discovered that the smart thing to do was to find new opportunities to take advantage of the new landscape:

When the studio decided to make the Citizen Siege film, they had a $40–60 million budget and were given the green light as an R-rated CG animated feature, they went into the early stages of development. But the global financial crisis "changed the terms in Hollywood [and] greatly reduced the chance of success". Publishers became even more risk-averse and Lanning realised it was going to be an "up-hill battle" to get the movie off the ground. Being a smaller company affected by the financial constraints more than bigger game developers, Lanning decided to put Citizen Siege, "Wage Wars" and all other associated projects from this era on hold. However, his partner Sherry McKenna said the abandonment of Citizen Siege was the result of " 'clear differences' with a third party" that has not yet been identified.

The following year, Lanning found his Oddworld Inhabitants company returning to where it all began—video games. While his work on the Quintology did cease after Munch's Oddysee, Lanning stood by his claim when Oddworld ceased producing video games that he denied ending game production. This proved true when their newest collaborators—Just Add Water—announced they were working with Oddworld Inhabitants.

"Oddworld" film
Lorne Lanning says that he and Sherry would love nothing more than to make an Oddworld film. Instead of writing the Abe stories as games, he wrote them as films and with deep character development because games were supposed to be just the launching pad for the property that is Oddworld, which would then feed into movies when the technology became more powerful and the CG cheaper. Separate from the Citizen Siege project but utilising the same machinima technology, the studio halted development before shopping the concept around because the 2008 global financial crisis meant no film publisher would take a risk on them for a $30–40 million project, and Lanning believes "Hollywood is a disaster right now".

Xmobb by Oddmob, Inc.
While Citizen Siege and its associated projects are on hold, Lanning maintains that he wants to tell those stories, but "that I'm going to have to pay for it myself. And that's part of what the new business is about." That new venture, called Xmobb, was created by Lorne Lanning and his longtime business partner, Oddworld co-founder and CEO Sherry McKenna, along with Daniel Goldman (co-founder of the Total Entertainment Network) in Emeryville, California. Xmobb was described as offering social networking with video and gaming services.

The business came about when Lanning saw that the human attention span was being spent on YouTube and Facebook more than on any other platform. Originally, he believed the most important thing in the video game industry was to build your own intellectual property, but he learned the newest IP was "people". His plan was to build a space where "cultures [are] more connected to more passion points" like friends, shows, hobbies etc. and where they can all be facilitated without anyone or anything being left out. Rather than telling audiences to invest their time in an IP created by someone else, Lanning looked at the relationships people were enjoying and the media they were sharing:

So the goal of Xmobb was to combine the endless library of media (social media like YouTube) with an endless possibility of human connection (social networks like Facebook) in a "gamified way". His major weapon in this idea came in the form of a new trust that had been fostered amongst audiences via social interaction and social media. This trust was very important in Lanning's view because it demonstrated the return of something that had been lost over the years:

Lanning's idea was a "space where people [can] gather en-masse to watch the same content, with people they know who are already watching together" in "virtual theatres" created by anyone under any theme, interest or topic while others gather to watch and contribute content in a constant stream. He thought of this gathering as the video game equivalent of the Super Bowl—millions of people gathering together in support of something they care about or something they want to fight for. By giving anyone with a computer the opportunity to share information with people all over the world in realtime, viewers would be able to see what is really going on in the world and begin to trust each other, as opposed to what they are being told by a "corporate funded media landscape that has its own agenda that is anything but democratic in nature [and] a massive misinformation machine that serves Wall Street and the White House." It was Lanning's goal to use this new trust to enlighten the world to what is really going on. He revisited the topic during the issue of Microsoft's DRM policy after the launch of the Xbox One, saying "companies should focus more on building brand trust and allowing the audience to filter who is a good guy and who's bad... that's what social networks and forums deal with [and] the more a company can build trust, the better they seem to do."

Lanning stressed that this new business venture was not about trying to make money for money's sake, nor to make a 20–30 million dollar Oddworld title that would compete on the market with 60–100 million dollar games. First and foremost, the idea was to "facilitate a way for people to come together and share in realtime, faster and faster, [so] we'll get enlightened faster as well." with the added bonus that "if we do [Xmobb] right, I get to finance the [Citizen Siege] movies myself and then they're not going to be compromised" by big publishers.

In August 2011, Lanning said the launch was a few months away, with patents filed under the business name Oddmobb, Inc., but at the Eurogamer Expo in September 2012, he revealed the failure of Xmobb. The associated websites have since been shut down. When Sony announced the PS4 in February 2013, Lanning revisited the launch and failure of Xmobb. He explained that the connectivity, controller, sharing and camera technology available on Sony's new console was the kind of technology he tried to create for Xmobb before finding it cost prohibitive.

Just Add Water partnership (2009–2015)
Lanning and McKenna's efforts to maintain ownership of their company paid off when digital distribution became an option in the video game industry. Gabe Newell, co-founder of online distribution company Valve, approached them in 2008 to release Abe's Oddysee and Abe's Exoddus on Valve's distribution software Steam. And in June 2009, they met with small-time UK game developers, Just Add Water at the 2009 Game Developers Conference. Gilray wanted Lanning to revisit the franchise for two reasons—firstly because he saw the Oddworld universe had so much scope within the environments they created, that he wanted to give life to the backgrounds the way Ridge Racer would have animation that didn't affect gameplay, but gave life to the environment and secondly, because he wanted Lanning to deliver on the promise of the full five games in the Oddworld Quintology. Lanning and his business partner Sherry McKenna's response was not to demand a licensing fee, nor demand to be the biggest hit, but simply if Just Add Water could build a sustainable business that provides the fanbase with quality offerings, then they would work together.

A year later, on 16 July 2010, Just Add Water revealed to the public that they had been working with Lorne Lanning and Sherry McKenna's Oddworld Inhabitants for 12 months. The small UK-based developer had been commissioned to begin work on multiple projects across multiple platforms, the first one at the request of Lanning to port Stranger's Wrath to the PC. Though Gilray wanted to begin work on a new Oddworld game, he was instead asked to remake Abe's Oddysee first and see how that performed before beginning something new, and took the opportunity to rebuild some of the Stranger's Wrath assets in high definition to show off his studio's capabilities before remastering the entire game. The original Stranger's Wrath developers also assisted Just Add Water in understanding the source code, which sped up development of the port. Lanning said he was happy to hand his "baby" over because the team at Just Add Water are just as passionate about his brand as he is, and is composed of fans of the Oddworld games that want to bring the same "love, integrity and sincerity to the brand that the original crew had." Stewart Gilray explained that initial conversations led to discussions about "new items" and their website now indicates they are the "exclusive developers for titles based upon the Oddworld brand", and has expanded their team from two to 17. This would not have been possible without Oddworld's faith in their own brand—they had the foresight to guarantee that ownership of their IPs would be returned to them after a couple of years out of the industry, and kept all of the assets from the original games, of which Just Add Water now has full access. Of Just Add Water, Lanning said, "In sitting at the [Just Add Water] studio... people are there until 1am... you know you have a team that cares about the content, they're not just trying to get a product done, they're trying to get something they're proud of done."

Digital distribution
Back when Abe's Oddysee first came out, Lorne Lanning believed that games had an expiration date because new console hardware was about showing off the new chips rather than maintaining an archive of games from previous consoles. But when Steam began distributing games digitally, he found there was life left in his games after all. "I thought that games would be disposable," Lanning admitted. "What I didn't expect was that ten years later, after Abe released in '97, on Steam... people were actually willing to start buying again." And though there was a monetary investment involved in making his games compatible for the PC using digital distributors like Steam and GOG, it cost them almost nothing to distribute digitally on the PSN because the games were already compatible. He found that Sony was treating its classic games the way Apple and iTunes treat classic music, allowing them new life for new and old audiences. Fifteen years after Lanning first created Abe, he was surprised to find that people still email him with the same passion he has for the games. "I was happily relieved and surprised that it did stick that much in people's minds," said Lanning, "I didn't start Oddworld as a businessman, I started it as a fan." And by a stroke of luck, the people involved in making the decisions to emulate PlayStation games on the PS3 are fans of the game and were also involved in Sony during its original launch. Now, Lanning has completely changed his view and firmly believes that content created today will have life in the future, as long as the game has quality, and utilizes digital distribution.

Digital distribution is one of the important elements in sustaining the Oddworld/Just Add Water partnership in the video game industry because of the vast savings in cost associated with moving games from developer to consumer digitally instead of physically. According to Lanning, when Abe's Oddysee was completed and distributed to the consumer, 20% of royalties went towards his team of developers. They then needed the game to make back approximately four million dollars in earnings using just their 20% in royalties to break even on the funds provided by their publisher, GT Interactive. Once that had been achieved, under the model that assumed the cost of Abe's Oddysee remained at US$59.99, his team of developers would receive just US$7 for every unit sold. The rest would go towards paying all the associated costs that go with publishing, marketing and distributing the game, such as disc manufacturing, licensing fees, fuel for transporting the game to retailers, retail staff and more. Gilray revealed that in 2013–2014, if Oddworld Inhabitants and Just Add Water chose to distribute a game on disc at retail for the Xbox 360, they would have to pay for a minimum of 50,000 discs per territory, at a cost of $600,000, just for manufacturing the discs, before factoring in marketing and development costs, hence the reason for higher costs at the retail shelf. And on top of everything else, their physical disc would have to compete with countless other games for selection on the retailer shelf.

But their current digital distribution model eliminates the "radical chasm between who really got the money and who's been doing a lot of the work." A game that would sell for US$9.99 on Steam, XBLA or PSN would still net the studio US$7 for every unit sold. So with digital distribution, all of the costs associated with distributing a physical game are non-existent as the studio "is not paying for plastic, advertising, shipping or a percentage to retailers... we're just giving it to gamers at a lower price, because we can." Under this model, the player is funding the games more than ever, with 70% of their money going directly to the developer to make more games, as opposed to the old model where 12% went to the developer and 88% went to the publisher. So the risk being undertaken by the developers with each project is considerably less, because they only need to sell 50,000 units for them to break even and stay in business, as opposed to the one million required in the first week of sales and a 5× or 10× return overall when using money provided by a major publisher. And because they don't have to concern themselves with reaching unit sales targets, they can spend time and money on extras like Vita and Wii U ports, despite operating at a financial loss with New 'n' Tasty! on those platforms, so as to not lock audiences out because of the platform they choose to play, whereas the model used by the big publishers would be to cancel those ports or ship them as an inferior copy to the other ports because there wouldn't be enough of a monetary return from their audience to justify the extra time spent on making them. But now, with their Just Add Water partnership, all elements of the business are working together towards the common goal of producing games to fund more games, working for just a 1.5× return in order to stay in business, keep people employed, grow the business, and in turn, the games. This lower sales requirement affords them the ability to experiment with their games in a way that wasn't possible when the budgets were in excess of ten million dollars, because a failure does not mean the end of the business as it did during the Stranger's Wrath era when they took a risk aiming for perfection using untried concepts without a history of user feedback to guide them.

Lanning says a 1½× return for their upcoming game would allow the company's two groups to focus on two projects—a new version of Abe's Exoddus using New 'n' Tasty!'s engine, and a new game. And the ports released by Just Add Water under this model are paving the way for more ambitious plans, as "each project is a bigger risk and a bigger step." The first risk was the Oddboxx on Steam, followed by porting the Oddboxx to PlayStation 3, Stranger HD and then Munch HD. Now, their success has paved the way for their biggest project (and risk) to date—rebuilding Abe's Oddysee to make Oddworld: New 'n' Tasty! And though this game has taken longer and cost more than the previous titles, the risk of going out of business or, "splitting the baby", is still considerably lower than had the developers gone through a major publisher. Stranger's Wrath HD for PS3, PC and Vita cost $250,000–300,000, but made a profit of one million dollars, all of which went into the budget for New 'n' Tasty!. As Lanning says, "Oddworld is about sustainable content in an unsustainable world". Their growth might be small, but being that their products are crowd-financed by the audience buying the games, there is no need to appease investors that have brought no value beyond their own cash, or answer to a board that wants to implement policies the studio doesn't agree with, which "is what drives most of the pressure and most of the distractions". Sensible Software co-founder Jon Hare says that other independent game developers have seen this new option and are not looking back, because they have been marginalized from the retail shelves by the bigger companies like EA Games and Ubisoft.

Under the agreement between Oddworld Inhabitants and Just Add Water that eliminates the traditional distribution models, "most of the money that the gamer is spending will come right back to the developer," meaning the majority of profits made after sales recoup production costs goes directly into making more games, not enriching the owners. In addition to the profits made from Stranger's Wrath HD, the entire profits from Munch's Oddysee HD on PS3 and Vita go towards New 'n' Tasty! This allows the studio to sell their games at a cheaper price point than the big studios making Triple-A titles. Lanning refers to this relationship as that of sharecropping, as opposed to serfdom. And he's finding that in this new landscape where "creators can find an audience at a lower price, offer a product cheaper, and directly nurture that community," that the big publishers are finding it hard to "justify their value" in the industry now, especially to the gamers that purchase their products at a higher cost, with most of their money going to the publishers themselves. Gilray said of his time at Lanning's Berkely house in 2010, "I came away from that with the feeling that, well, that they felt, knew, the game and the brand were in the right hands." It is still Lorne Lanning's (and now Stewart Gilray's) ambition to complete the original five-game Quintology that begun with Abe's Oddysee and continued with Munch's Oddysee. And while that ambition was halted by the decision to abandon the publisher/studio relationship, Oddworld Inhabitants, in partnership with Just Add Water, and utilizing digital distribution, are now better equipped to continue the Quintology—this time with Just Add Water as the developer and Oddworld as their micro-publisher. As for platforms, they refer to themselves as "platform-agnostic"—happy to port their games to any platform.

The other change to the video game industry that happened at the same time was the release of the iPhone democratising the industry. Before platforms like the App Store allowed anyone to sell their games, the only game developers around were businesses because consoles required a developer to purchase multiple $20,000 software development kits in order to build their game on their platform. But when the iPhone came out, the SDK was free to download, and the App Store was free to upload to. This caused an influx of games into the mobile space, because now "the guys who didn't have the ability to get ten dev stations before can make a business" and it "caused a whole migration of talent into a space where they could reach an audience on their own." As a result, even the big development companies working on Triple-A titles created their own apps company to open up another access point that they didn't have before. Sony was the first between the two big console developers to follow this trend, which led to Lanning's criticism of Microsoft at E3 in 2013, which was reluctant to allow independent developers onto its console as easily as Sony did with the PlayStation.

Lanning's plan to transform Oddworld Inhabitants from a game-developing studio to a self-sustaining micro-publisher independent of "disconnected investor demands," with an ability to communicate with its audience, is where Lanning says the independent developer movement needs to go. Oddworld and Just Add Water are "too small to be disruptive, but we can... succeed in the disruptive landscape." And in January 2013, Lanning revealed Oddworld Inhabitants has not sought publishers since its last signing with EA in 2004.

Just Add Water releases
Just Add Water's first release in partnership with Oddworld Inhabitants was the porting of 2005's Stranger's Wrath to the PC's digital network, Steam, in 2010. That was followed by a high-definition remastered edition, Oddworld: Stranger's Wrath HD, released digitally on 21 December 2011 for PlayStation 3. The PC port was released 9 September 2012 and the PS Vita received release on 18 December 2012. Developed by one programmer in five months with Gilray helping with art assets, the port began life plagued with coding problems, leaving Gilray worried he killed the Oddworld brand. But he spent two months "living on the Steam forums" listening to the issues fans had with playing the game, which audiences appreciated, and made the necessary patches until the port became a success. Their next release was Oddworld Inhabitants' third game, Oddworld: Munch's Oddysee, remastered. Oddworld: Munch's Oddysee HD was first released to European and Australian markets on 19 December 2012 for the PS3 and the PS Vita in February 2014. Originally exclusive Xbox titles, the HD editions of Stranger and Munch are not expected to be released for the Xbox platforms due to disagreements between Microsoft, Oddworld Inhabitants and Just Add Water. Oddboxx, a collection of Abe's Oddysee, Abe's Exoddus, Munch's Oddysee and Stranger's Wrath was released to European markets for PC on 20 December 2010, then released with HD versions of Munch and Stranger on PS3 on 6 November 2013. Oddboxx has not been released in North American markets due to technicalities with publisher code on two of the games, so the studio packaged the Abeboxx for release on the PSN on 26 November 2013, composed of digital versions of Abe's Oddysee and Abe's Exoddus.

New 'n' Tasty!

See main article: Oddworld: New 'n' Tasty!

In re-releasing Oddworld's earlier games on the digital marketplace, Lanning was able to have an open dialogue with the fans. He found that audiences were asking for what would eventually become New 'n' Tasty! They wanted to see Abe in the classic 2D style of a platform game because gameplay was simpler, and players "don't want to spend time steering around the world making sure they're looking in the right direction... they just want to absorb the experience and have tight controls, and... that rotoscope quality of a lifelike guy." And with most of the horsepower of the game engine being saved by not needing to create player movement in 3D, it's allowed the developers to bring the quality of the environments and backgrounds into that of lifelike sets while still running at 60 frames per second. Stewart Gilray also confirmed the side-scrolling market still had a lot of life in it, and with their Unity engine bringing realtime scenery to life, it made sense. Unity was also the best option when choosing engines because it cost $5,000 for licensing, as opposed to their previous choice which would have cost $100,000. If they were to upgrade the game using modern technology, they wanted to make sure the game would use continuous scrolling instead of fixed flip screens, it had to have realtime dynamic lighting and realtime 3D visuals instead of pre-rendered bitmaps, it had to fix things they felt were wrong with the original game, and it had to add elements that were included in Stranger HD, such as difficulty levels, but maintain the original's difficulty and goriness. Oddworld Inhabitants and Just Add Water decided to use 3D technology while "staying true to that platforming nature on the controls level" and only if they could maintain the same experience players had with the original, to satisfy the fans of 2D games in a way that Lanning termed "neo-stalgia". He defined neo-stalgia as a way of using newer technology to bring back nostalgic forms of gameplay. Oddworld: New 'n' Tasty! was the demonstration of that neo-stalgia—it utilizes new 3D technology, yet is still a 2D platform game—now commonly referred as 2.5D. Just Add Water used the source code from the original game, and its sequel, as a base to produce the game.

Gilray described the biggest challenge of production was to recreate the same feel as the original, and went as far as to say that "we've gored it up so much we might have to pull it back for age rating." Apart from sticking to 2D gameplay, the game's visuals bring life to the backgrounds to "tell stories in microcosm about the wider universe". To do this, the team looked at all of the visuals from the original game to determine where they could give the settings depth and interaction, including original design concepts that were omitted due to the limitations of the technology in 1997. Gilray always wanted to see a version of the game running with realtime 3D art to give the world life, and now the new version has clouds moving in realtime, critters running around, living factories, and flocks of flying birds that create a realistic environment around the player. "RuptureFarms now looks like a vibrant, busy factory churning out junk food. There's machinery grinding and chopping in the background. The temples have a sense of depth and size, with wildlife going about its business in the background." But Gilray assures fans that barring "a couple of wee tweaks," it is still the same game people played 15 years ago. There are two or three new cutscenes included, while some originals have been changed with the permission of Lorne Lanning because they were how he intended for the original release had he not been constrained by memory limitations. Similarly, audio engineer Mike Taylor explained they are redoing the original in-game music and keeping to the same style by using the original music files and polishing them up where necessary. New cutscenes require new music, which is being composed by Michael Bross. The other development involves cueing issues with the music. In the original game, the music that would signal impending danger would be cued by the player's movements, but often late. But Taylor explains that the technology today has allowed them to make the music "much more responsive and far more in tune with what the player is doing and seeing." Sound effects had to be re-created as no original assets exist for them, and lead voice artist is Lorne Lanning, who reprised his voice parts from the original.

The enhancements are all about milking the new technology in every way they can to "create an emotional experience where you cared about that character." The goal for Oddworld Inhabitants has always been to "maximize and make richer an emotional experience"—games with heart, intent and emotional engagement of the characters—characters whose actions, emotions, goals, frustrations, beliefs influence their actions and enhance the experience for the player in more ways than simply pointing and shooting. Gilray also adds that the themes of corporatism, exploitation, pollution, consumerism and loss of individual spirituality to The Man are all themes explored in the game, particularly the dark side of globalisation and how it would shock audiences to see what the news is not representing.

On 31 December 2015, Stewart Gilray revealed that not long after New 'n' Tasty! was released for the PS4, it became clear that Just Add Water would not be working on any new projects for Oddworld Inhabitants, but will devote a small team of his developers to finish work on the platforms for the game. No reason was given for their departure from the partnership.

ADEPT Games partnership
On 27 September 2011, ADEPT Games issued a press release announcing a partnership with Oddworld Inhabitants. It stated they would be working on content combining Oddworld with their iPhone game app Trixel. Creative Director Daniel Boutros said he was a big fan of the Oddworld brand and Just Add Water's Stewart Gilray said they could not turn them down when they saw what was being offered to them.

Square One Games
Oddworld Inhabitants revealed that Canadian independent video game developer Square One Games had taken on the job of porting Stranger's Wrath to mobile platforms iOS and Android after approaching Oddworld Inhabitants believing the game would be a special product on mobile. Lanning was sure it would not work because the game was maxing out the original Xbox's engine in 2005, but he gave the developers access to the assets from that Xbox version, though the mobile port will also make use of the recent HD remake's assets. Lanning's biggest concern with porting the game to mobile devices was the touch screen interface required, but he was so impressed by another independent developer's determination to make it work, and their business model to bring other developer's games to new platforms, that he gave them the chance. He has been pleasantly surprised with how well it has come along, explaining the resolution has not been compromised and it runs at 30fps with added features they were not even able to do on the original Xbox version.

Square One Games is also working on an updated port of Munch's Oddysee for the Steam platform that includes some HD environment assets, but no announcement has been made about a full remaster.

PlayStation 4 game development
On 20 February 2013, Sony's launch of the PlayStation 4 at its See The Future conference included a slide littered with logos of development studios currently working on projects for the upcoming console, one of them being Just Add Water's. Being that Sony's lead architect for the PS4 is Mark Cerny, "who has an incredible depth of knowledge and long-time experience in developing games" himself, and to whom Lanning pitched the original idea of Abe in the early '90s, the development of the PS4 included an invitation to video game developers for the first time in the industry to get their perspective on how to optimize the use of the hardware to making game construction easier and better. And Lanning found himself invited to those meetings, with Cerny and Sony showing an interest in independent developers like Oddworld Inhabitants and Just Add Water that Lanning had not experienced before. That interest was demonstrated in February 2013 when Sony first announced the PS4 in New York along with what Lanning described as a "huge diversity of titles" from various small and large developers, culminating in his own inclusion on stage at Sony's E3 presentation and a booth to show off New 'n' Tasty!.

Just Add Water community and PR manager, Daniel Morse, has confirmed that the studio is currently developing content for the PS4, and there is speculation that one of the upcoming PS4 projects is a new Oddworld game. Oddworld Inhabitants announced in a press release that New 'n' Tasty! will be released on the PS4 in 2014. Lorne Lanning expressed his joy at Oddworld's new relationship with Sony, where Abe first began. He calls it "the smartest development environment that we've ever seen," and believes it's "designed to facilitate developer needs", including independent developers, which is who he believes will bring about the "$100 million properties" of the next generation. "Today more than ever the indie developer has a far greater chance to survive... due to the self-publishing policies of the forward thinking networks that have invited them in," that allow those developers to publish their games "with less friction and a lower cost." The ease and affordability with which independent developers can get their games onto consoles minimises the damage of a failure to the console's overall success, but also gives the developers "more room to take chances and fail at them but still survive". And Sony's focus is not on themselves, locking developers to their console alone, but rather on the developer, and "what will enable you to build the best games possible with your limited resources." Of the potential for Just Add Water on PlayStation 4 development, Gilray said that it has been a breeze to develop for, due to Cerny's decision to create a system for developers, and "so far we're blown away by what we've managed to achieve with the hardware... our imaginations are running away with themselves." And the reaction from fans during Lanning's introduction on stage amongst developers of some of the biggest games in the industry was an indicator that he and Oddworld Inhabitants are in the right place at the right time, "I just kept from crying."

Following the announcement of Sony's PlayStation 4 Pro console, Oddworld Inhabitants released a statement confirming they and their developer partners Frima Studio were in possession of PS4 Pro hardware. While not confirming what games would be on the hardware, the company explained that the PS4 Pro complemented their "design ethos for Oddworld: Soulstorm, allowing the ability to turn up the dials on visual fidelity, lighting and physically based rendering."

Xbox relationship
The high definition remaster of Oddworld's fourth game, Stranger's Wrath HD, which was previously available on PC via Steam, was also submitted to Microsoft to be included on the XBLA. Microsoft denied the submission and cited the 2GB file size limit of Xbox Live Arcade games. When the developers shrunk the game below the 2GB file limit and submitted the game back to Microsoft, they did not receive a response. But after the game was released on PS3 via the PSN, Microsoft contacted Oddworld Inhabitants and told them they wanted a simultaneous release along with the PlayStation version. But they then told them the game was also not eligible for Games on Demand because it was released on the PSN at a lower price point and did not meet Microsoft's margins. Lanning reiterated to them that his company was not requesting they provide money or advertising for his game, but simply the ability for fans to play his game on their platform, before eventually giving up because "we couldn't get clear answers for 15 months" and they don't have the marketing or legal teams to satisfy Microsoft's every requirement.

At the 2012 Eurogamer Expo, Oddworld Inhabitants and Just Add Water revealed the platform aim for New 'n' Tasty! of Microsoft's Xbox Live Arcade alongside PS3, PS Vita and PC. Despite Microsoft not allowing the inclusion of Stranger's Wrath or Munch's Oddysee to their Xbox platform, New 'n' Tasty! was to be permitted because it is a new game. However, during the 2013 Electronic Entertainment Expo, Lanning revealed that the game is unlikely to appear on the XBLA for either the Xbox 360 or the Xbox One because of Microsoft's policy that game developers partner with a third party publisher before releasing games on their platforms. This is despite receiving concept approval from Microsoft for New 'n' Tasty! to be released on the Xbox 360. In addition, Oddworld Inhabitants cannot stand in as Just Add Water's publisher to fulfil the requirement of a third party publisher partnership because a publisher has to have published two games at retail prior to submitting a game to Microsoft, which they can't afford to do, leaving their only option to partner with a publisher that already has a successful disc-based sales record. Most frustrating is that Oddworld Inhabitants has everything they need to release the game on Xbox consoles. But Oddworld Inhabitants doesn't need this because the game was entirely self-funded, and partnering with a publisher would mean "carv[ing] out a piece of the revenue to share with a Microsoft-friendly publisher that did little to zero in efforts to finance, develop, manage community and bring the product to market," limiting Oddworld's revenue and making it harder for them to survive. Lanning expressed his frustrations, "Why do we need a publisher when we self-finance our games, we build our own IP, we manage our own IP and we've turned nearly two million units online as indie publishers sold—not free downloads?" His philosophy is, "in order for us to give up the revenues we depend on as a share, they have to be bringing something of value to our sales," and if not, then he is happy to take his chances without them, because "we haven't been doing badly ourselves" on the other available platforms that will have his games.

Lanning says the industry has to get past the "old way of thinking," where the richest companies control everything down from the publisher and developer through to the consumer, especially when the popularity of indie gaming has exploded in the last few years. He compares the differing attitudes of Microsoft and Sony towards independent developers in the gaming space with the differing policies of Sotheby's and eBay in the auction space, concluding that eBay is the more favoured option because it allows anyone to sell anything as long as it has an audience. With the arrival of platforms like iOS, iTunes and Android, independent developers and gamers have seen what a wider selection of gaming options (and prices) looks like. And when Microsoft's business model dictated that independent offerings would be shut out if they did not come with "onerous terms and forced partnerships" that offer no increased chance of success, Lanning was not surprised that Microsoft's policies would "blow up in its face," This shutout of independent developers results in "fragmented inaccessible markets that... leave room only for the enormous players," which Lanning believes goes against the recent popularity of indie games and the audiences that want them. On the other hand, Sony was one of the "forward thinking players in the gaming space [that] had been paying attention and providing means to get their models and policies closer" to the "wider buffet" and away from the "outdated, tired ways of the console wars of the dark ages." Only now is it possible to offer developers the ability to "build more unique, diversified, and niche experiences with smaller development teams" and gamers a "wider diversity of experience, innovation, and price point" while the console prospers and the developers continue to employ people, improve their skills and maintain their existence. Lanning sees this buffet of choice, and the affordable price points, as how this generation will finally gain back control over what they consume from the publishers, retailers and platform holders, rather than just accepting what they're given, and that any company standing in their way will emerge without much credibility.

Lanning has stated he will consider partnering with a publisher, "but 'it has to make sense' in terms of revenue share." He has since stated that his focus has moved away from Microsoft because they aren't "acknowledging people like us," and not listening to independent developers, or the audience demanding independent offerings. Despite calls from fans to relent to Microsoft's policy in order to make millions more dollars, Lanning is adamant "Oddworld wasn't built on selling out." Oddworld Inhabitants Community and PR Manager Dan Morse said, "we want there to be a clear message to Microsoft that as an indie company we would love to see our games on the Xbox One, but as masters of our own destiny."

According to Lanning, Sony had the advantage in the independent market at E3 because Microsoft failed to "secure the diverse, free-flow of content from the indie sector" when they announced the Xbox One. He says Microsoft's shutout of this market shows a lack of business foresight, because he believes the next blockbuster hits "are going to be what happened in the indie community" today. This is because current blockbusters have $100 million budgets provided by their publishers, and thus, those publishers will only allow proven methods of success when it comes to game design to guarantee that their money is not wasted on a risk that could fail, whereas independents can take those risks because they're not gambling with a publisher's money. So Sony's encouraging of indie developers and their self-published titles means innovative titles will come out of [the PlayStation] "where people have the freedom and the insanity to try crazy new stuff," while Microsoft was just looking at the developers and the games that would increase their profits.

Lanning has seen Microsoft take strides in a more positive direction since E3. He is aware that Microsoft have spoken to indie developers to get a better understanding of the sorts of policies that are healthy for developers and gamers, but is waiting to hear from those developers about the levels of friction involved in releasing a game in the Microsoft universe. Since those comments, Microsoft announced their ID@Xbox program, which allows independent developers to self-publish on the Xbox One. Lanning described the program as a "bittersweet victory" for the independent community, and Stewart Gilray has confirmed Just Add Water's application to register for the program and is just waiting on Microsoft's permission to allow them to develop for them because he does not want Oddworld fans on the Xbox One platform to miss out. However, he laments the way the program labels independent developers differently because they self-publish, compared to the major developers that team up with major publishers, whereas Nintendo and Sony identify all developers that want to release on their consoles as third party developer/publishers no matter how big or small. Before committing completely to making an Xbox One port of the game, Lanning wants to be sure that the game will still be allowed on the platform in the event that they miss submission, because "we can't absorb that loss" financially, though he is confident conversations will work out. The ID@Xbox program does not extend to Xbox 360. On 10 June 2014, Lanning confirmed that New 'n' Tasty! will be released on the Xbox One before the end of 2014 after getting "past" the "talks" that were stalling it, and will not have to adhere to Microsoft's parity clause that demands the Xbox version be released at the same time as other platforms, crediting Microsoft for being nice and convenient about developing the Xbox version. The release was further delayed, but was made available to download from the Xbox One Games Store on 27 March 2015.

Partnership with Frima Studio, Fat Kraken Studio & Sabotage Studio
Lanning has stated he is looking at starting a new company to partner Oddworld Inhabitants and begin work on a non-Oddworld game. He launched a Kickstarter in 2015 to fund the project, which he says should not cost the $5–6 million dollars that a new Oddworld game would, and that it "stays with the [Oddworld] brand of quality, but not the IP."

On 3 March 2017, Fat Kraken Studios announced they had been working with Oddworld Inhabitants on Oddworld: Soulstorm.

On 10 June 2017, Oddworld Inhabitants revealed that Sabotage Studio was working with them on Oddworld: Soulstorm.

On 14 March 2016, Oddworld Inhabitants' press release revealed they have in-house development teams in the UK and California and have partnered with developers Frima Studio in Canada to work on their new title, Oddworld: Soulstorm for a 2017 release. The press release referenced events from Abe's Exoddus but stopped short of calling the game a remake in the same way New 'n' Tasty! was to Abe's Oddysee.

Oddworld: Soulstorm development

In a 17 January 2013 post on the Oddworld Inhabitants website, the team asked fans to vote on which game they would like to see produced after the completion of Oddworld: New 'n' Tasty!. Among the options was Abe's Exoddus HD. It received the most votes with 3,950. Series creator, Lorne Lanning confirmed the new version of Exoddus will be the next content produced, along with expansion packs, and that it requires 250,000 units of New 'n' Tasty! to be sold, or "a couple million" dollars to fund it. On 12 August, it was revealed that New 'n' Tasty! sold 2.4 million units on the PlayStation 4 alone, and Lanning confirmed that they are "in the planning stages of Exoddus... we're re-doing it like New 'n' Tasty!"

While the new game picks up where New 'n' Tasty! left off the same way Abe's Exoddus did after Abe's Oddysee, Lanning, said "there was a deeper, darker, and more sinister story that we never got to tell [and] Soulstorm gives us the opportunity to flesh out more meat on the bones of an original spine, but re-tell the fable from a very different angle." At the time of Abe's Exoddus, Lanning had 9 months to produce the game, so he approved a script within a week to fast track production and reach the publisher's deadline of Christmas 1998. When revisiting the reviews of Exoddus, Lanning agreed with the consensus that it had "twice the gameplay and half the heart." Now with the time and freedom to make the game he always intended, he has decided against the New 'n' Tasty! principal of making the exact same game on new technology, and this time wants to use Exoddus as inspiration at a "high concept level," but telling a darker story on the New 'n' Tasty! engine. Lanning described the story in Abe's Oddysee as a classic fable, and changing it would be like changing a Dr. Seuss story, but with Abe's Exoddus, the story is being rewritten to make "twice the gameplay, twice the heart." Soulstorm Brew is still at the centre of the story, but everything else has been rewritten. The first game was about Abe waking up to his own slavery, and Exoddus focused on their slavery to habits and addictions, but Lanning aims to make Soulstorm more volatile and devious by implementing mechanics left out of Exoddus that compare Soulstorm Brew to napalm and allow the player to splash surfaces and coat things to set them alight. Lanning also says the game is darker because Abe is going to realise the scope of his task to save the world, but that the Oddworld humour remains saying the game is funnier than ever before.

Oddworld Inhabitants confirmed they are in possession of PS4 Pro hardware, which they say complements their design ethos for Oddworld: Soulstorm, though they stopped short of confirming the game would be released on that console. It was Lanning's intent to release the game in 2017, however on 27 April 2017, he revised that the game would be released in 2018. It had been delayed again for a 2019 release. In 2019, the game was delayed for a 2020 release at the Game Developer Conference in San Francisco when a new trailer was shown showcasing a cinematic from Soulstorm.

Future Transmedia Storytelling
At the 2017 Eurogamer Expo in Birmingham, Lorne Lanning revealed he's preparing to take Oddworld into new media. He hopes that studio heads will see the franchise as "a successful IP, a decades-old franchise with a loyal fan following that sells millions of units" that makes it impossible for them to resist investing in a movie or TV series. One of the methods for preparing the franchise to cross into new media is to upscale their database of design assets from the upcoming Soulstorm game beyond that that will be used in the game, to a level required by these media. His preference is to develop a prolonged TV series, because it "is way more engaging than doing a 90-minute movie that goes out in one and maybe gets a sequel," and is more within their budget of $10 million.

Purpose

When Lanning was young, he felt lost and overwhelmed by what he saw was wrong with the world, as consumers were fed lies through television and newspapers. He grew up being programmed with information about nuclear submarines, global thermal nuclear war, visions of napalming during the Vietnam war on new colour televisions and the possibility of a new generation of people not dying of old age, at a time when he was just discovering mythologies such as Santa Claus. He stored an enormous amount of what he wanted to say concerning what was going on in the world about which the media was not forthcoming. And he felt that entertainers like Steven Spielberg, George Lucas and Bob Dylan were helping to save the world with entertainment, which was when he discovered that the media most influential on public opinion were mass-produced and electronic. He was inspired by the influence of the media on his life: how Jim Henson and Sesame Street taught him to read where school had failed; how Dr. Seuss was able to create stories still being read to new generations that give people a better moral compass and healthier ways to look at the world; how George Orwell took his personal experiences during World War II to create stories designed to wake people up to the realities of the world around them; how George Lucas's Star Wars could succeed where religion and philosophy were failing at a time of religious deficit in America, making him "believe in the possibilities of entertainment for change."

When Lanning was working with Sherry McKenna at Rhythm and Hues, his eyes were opened to the possibilities that the CG industry had to offer. While most in the industry were talking CG down, he correctly predicted its potential, watching Pixar become "the most successful film studio in world history". He saw videos games in the same way, describing them as the "pop of pop mediums," and wanted to get involved because of its potential to become the most successful medium and offer "nutritious" content. By nutritious, he meant that if video games were a part of the four main food groups, they would be in the "junk food" category, because they're not used to get a degree or a job, they're purely for pop entertainment. But Lanning believes that video games have the ability to become one of the nutritious food groups by offering useful content with a meaningful message and a psychic, spiritual value to users In categorizing a nutritious game, Lanning explained that they should involve vision, creativity and a richness to lift themselves out of the narrowing of options he was beginning to see. And when games start to "embody more of the heart that we expect from classical forms of entertainment... more of the soul that we get from a great movie," such as stories with emotional depth, powerful character dilemmas and emotional engagement from the audience, the video game industry will expand exponentially. Lanning is first and foremost an artist, and "as an artist, you're constantly trying to figure out how to integrate those things you care about in life in your medium of expression." And he found that video games were the perfect medium for combining the philosophies and realities he's observed in the world with the tools and technologies he loves, allowing him to repackage that content into a viable story for an audience with a meaningful message about what is really going on in the world—the Clif Bar instead of the potato chips. So he wanted to instil a morality in video games so that their message could give hope to the next generation of kids and make them feel less lost in the world. But he also wanted to weaponize the pop medium of video games to be used against the "frauds" in charge:

Unlike most video game development studios, Lanning and Sherry McKenna did not think of themselves as starting a business. In the early 1990s, Lanning found that video game publishers were not interested in financing entire franchise properties that had plans for multiple sequels "because sequels only sell 50% of the originals". Lanning saw this as the mistake 20th Century Fox made by relinquishing Star Wars licensing rights to George Lucas. And Lanning realised that the reason sequels were not as successful as the originals was because video games did not come with emotionally compelling characters the way movies did. At this point, video game characters only existed to kill off other characters. So Lanning wanted to create a property that could be recognised as soon as it was seen, like The Muppets, like Star Wars and like Hanna Barber or the Looney Tunes so that new content within the same property, be they sequels or not, could maintain the brand familiarity of the originals, and hopefully its success. Fast forward to today and the video game industry is a sequel-driven industry. Lanning likened Oddworld to a band making music, and he wanted to be "the Pink Floyd of gaming as opposed to a Britney Spears"—the insinuation being that "I don't want to be told [by the publisher] what to make. I want to make the songs I want to make." And those were stories that convey deeper messages about what was really going on in the world, because the artist's vision was more important than the industry's economic requirements, "I didn't care about making any entertainment if it's not going to be what I care about in life, and so to separate the two is something I'm not interested in." He believed the only way to do so was to "build a globally-recognized brand [and] wind up with the sort of integrity that might stay intact over the years."

Lanning has always believed that society is "under the umbrella of massively deceptive campaigns to keep people ignorant, in fear, and unknowingly supportive of truly evil policies," and the dark humor possible in video games was his way of illustrating that truth. Particularly, setting his games on the fictional Oddworld allows him to get away with more than he would if the games were set on Earth. And using a metaphor in that way is how he disguises the message he is trying to send, because his partner Sherry McKenna explains that "nobody wants to be preached to... you get up on a platform and tell people how the world should be, and they'll walk away... but if you can grab their attention with irony and humour, then you've grabbed them." Lanning refers to this development philosophy as Trojan Horse pop. This strategy involves packaging meaningful messages deep and personal to his beliefs beneath the veil of an entertaining video game, in the way the Trojans hid deep within the bowels of the wooden horse from Virgil's Aeneid. Hence his games touch on elements of "slavery, globalization, food crisis and animal testing" in an entertaining but thought-provoking game that doesn't preach to the gamers, yet still contains the messages for those willing to consume them. The challenge now was to do that in a free market society capitalistically driven on growth only, where games with artistic vision are considered too risky to the point of being suicidal industry decisions.

Lanning's original plan was for Oddworld Inhabitants to be a "colossal transmedia endeavour, born of a visionary sense that interactive and non-interactive entertainment would at some point converge, assisted by evolving digital communications." While it was to eventually encompass film and the online world, it would begin with video games because they "could be a potentially powerful medium for telling great stories" and because so much American mind share was devoted to video games at the time. But his intention was to own his properties and his creations forever, rather than follow the business expectation of licensing characters to the highest bidder. He saw iconic creations like Star Wars, Disney and Pixar, that became "pied pipers of the most popular characters with noble causes, as a general practice... just becoming the brands on the worst quality health products for new generations... that are being pushed by the largest companies" and marketed with misinformation about its unhealthiness Instead, Lanning wanted to create characters of high moral integrity and use them to enforce a new licensing model which involved only licensing to companies that use better practices for its employees and for the environment, because "for creators, some things are more important than money".

He also believes that video games have the power to have a profoundly positive effect on the planet. Right now, the purpose of games to make money and entertain is just the tip of the iceberg. But if video game developers were asked to make games that could:

Lanning still believes that video games are suffering what has plagued all entertainment industries—an "unbalanced ratio of Britney Spears-class" content versus deeper "Pink Floyd-like" complexity." But he hopes the 21st century will continue the trend that storytellers like Shakespeare, Pink Floyd and his inspirations Aldous Huxley, George Orwell and HG Wells have used to "create deeper more meaningful and relevant content that reflects the challenging issues happening in the world around them today". The obstacles preventing them from getting these more meaningful stories out to their audiences, according to Lanning, are "money, means and the fear of soap box activism". Sales and marketing departments are more concerned with profit and less with meaningful stories. As a result, the big budget triple-A titles are least likely to risk their profits by releasing content with deeper meaning instead of with tried and true methods of success, because they work in an environment of "investment versus returns" dictated by the publishers providing the money they need to make the game. However, if developers can create games that are cheaper and with little or no investment from a publisher, they retain more creative influence on the end product and can then make a game with more meaningful content, instead of what will sell more units. But the danger of making games with these messages is the risk of "alienating an often jaded userbase through activist ideals" and making them feel like they are being dictated to by someone on a soap box, instead of entertained way video games have always done. But Lanning believes that the documentary filmmaking industry shows an evolving appetite for reflecting relevant truths that leave audiences with more lasting impressions and value to their lives, hence his method of Trojan Horse pop. And video games can do this the way music and film has, but only if it is led by the independent sector, because they don't have to guarantee high profit margins for investments coming from publishers.

Marketing

In this new era of the video game industry, Oddworld Inhabitants was able to use social networking to find a new audience and listen to them. When Lanning first entered the industry with Abe's Oddysee in the mid 90s, developers could only rely on focus groups and market research for feedback; they would only see review scores after release; and stores would not give them information on who was buying their games. But by then, it was too late to allow the audience to contribute to its development. Today, however, social networking has allowed them to be in constant contact with their audience through the planning and development stages to allow them to make decisions on development, and on which games to create. When they released a trailer for New 'n' Tasty! during its development, by the same night, they had received 10,000 responses through Facebook, Twitter and YouTube, by the next day, 20,000 responses, numbers no marketing department could ever generate at the time of Abe's Oddysee in 1997 with market research or focus groups. "Content co-creation" is all about facilitating a conversation between creator and player, which Lanning believes was not possible in the time of distributing at retail outlets, and according to him, is the future of game development because it extends the game beyond the written story. And it allows players to feel a sense of ownership that they have helped model the very game they have played. "It's one thing to say, 'Look at this picture of this beautiful baby.' It's another thing to say, 'Look at this picture of my beautiful baby.' There's a whole different depth of connection and ownership," Lanning said. They also discovered that it didn't matter to audiences about the brand going big, but that they targeted more platforms and networks for audiences to play on.

So the studio polled their audience to find out what kind of game they wanted to play, and found that fans wanted Abe's Oddysee redone like Stranger's Wrath. While the relationship between Oddworld Inhabitants and Just Add Water was symbiotic, with JAW constantly running things by Oddworld Inhabitants via email conversations, Lanning told JAW to ask the audience for input in answering their questions about the game, because they are the ones that will be playing it. The more you engage them in the process, "that feedback is going to be really, really valuable" and when they see that you are genuinely listening, they feel like they are being heard and it creates "deeper more passionate fan bases". Audiences also had an influence on choosing the next project after New 'n' Tasty! saying they wanted Exoddus redone in the same way, resulting in what will become Oddworld: Soulstorm in 2017, and the response from the press release showed them that interest in the brand was still very much alive.

Along with getting the games into the consumers' hands, publishing companies advertise a developer's game to the consumers. And for the first time in Oddworld's time as an independent developer, they have had to address the issue of advertising without the five million dollar marketing campaign that publishers provided them in the past, Lanning says the responsibility is back on indies to build their own brand visibility and audience relationships in order to market themselves, so they focused on capturing their community of fans and relying on the spread through social networks and the media to create the visibility required to keep them in business.

Just Add Water's Stewart Gilray was the head of marketing during their partnership with Oddworld and utilized different methods for engaging with fans, such as conducting online interviews for gaming sites, Q&A sessions, web advertisements, a live stream of their headquarters and communicating directly with Oddworld's fans via websites such as NeoGAF, whose visitors have shown delight in the ability to interact directly with the developers. 2012 also saw the inaugural "MudoCon" event at Eurogamer—an event where fans of the Oddworld universe from around the world could meet up, similar to Comic Con. Oddworld Inhabitants also involved fans in naming the new version of Abe's Oddysee, with Lanning expressing his delight at their choice of New 'n' Tasty!, which in the game was signalling the end of Abe, but now represents his rebirth.

Lanning said that Just Add Water came to him asking what they should name the new version and his first response was to ask the audience because they care as much as the developers do and was better than anything PR firms and creative groups have ever given him. The quality of the responses they received from fans encouraged Lanning to ask them to submit art and music for the game. And after seeing the work of Jonny Eveson, Lanning asked him to design the logo for New 'n' Tasty!. They hired William Bunce-Edwards, a super-fan who had been running a public Oddworld forum to be their studio co-ordinator and manage the fan community online. The studio also involved fans by asking them to submit audio recordings of their voice for the chance to win their inclusion in the game as the voice of one of the mudokons.

When YouTube introduced a new Content ID system in December 2013 allowing holders of copyright material to flag content they had not approved to be published on the service, such as Let's Plays, commercial trailers, and screen shots, Oddworld Inhabitants issued a statement on their own website informing fans that they give "explicit permission to anyone on the service to broadcast using Oddworld games" without fear of being issued a copyright claim, because "nothing makes us happier than to see you guys enjoying our games, and it's something we encourage wholeheartedly." YouTube and Twitch are platforms that Oddworld Inhabitants take seriously because today, they're more important for game exposure than television, and it's where fans are the most objective, which Lanning believes is important for developers when seeking feedback. And on Twitch, customer feedback can be watched in real time.

On 30 January 2013, Oddworld Inhabitants launched a competition inviting fans to submit names for five trophies to be included on the PlayStation port of the game, with winners announced 14 February to receive a signed game poster, code for the PlayStation platform of their choice, and inclusion in the game's credits. None of these things would have happened outside of the digital world. When Lanning is asked how he would encourage new fans to his game, he directs them to the oldest fans of his franchise, because "they have a certain passion, they've stayed with us... they speak to it better than we do [and] we're not paying them".

By involving fans so early on in the production of the game, beginning with letting them choose what game the developers would make, and then its title and the design of its cover art, the relationship has encouraged people to offer content for free because they want to see the developers survive, whereas in the past, developers would have to pay for people to contribute voices. And by producing a product with enough quality that it creates the kind of brand awareness that mobilises an audience into supporting developers, that product can be financially incentivising enough for big companies like Sony, Apple or Microsoft to support and invest in—the best example being that of Minecraft. And if developers can get the kind of exposure that comes with that support, but remain independent, then the blockbuster titles of the next generation will come out of the indie space.

The other important factor that has ensured their revival is the integrity that the Oddworld brand sustained when they first made their video games. The Oddworld games were built on millions in funding compared to the current games on portable platforms that are made with so much less. The 2D nature of the Abe games has also helped, according to Lanning, as mobile platforms lend itself well to 2D games, hence there is no judgment towards Oddysee and Exoddus for being 2D.

The games have found success a second time on the digital landscape, due in small part to the guerrilla marketing possible with today's media, but more importantly because of the brand recognition that came from nurturing their original audience in the late 90s, which Lanning believes has them fortunately ahead of the indie developers pack. Said Lanning, "As long as we don't try to exploit the dollars out of that fanbase in cheap ways... then we should be able to keep growing that fanbase and reigniting it," with the goal to be raising enough money to make triple-A titles that are self-funded.

Lanning found that the fans that grew up on Abe's Oddysee and Abe's Exoddus in the late 90s are now parents that have children, and when those games became available digitally through Steam and PSN, they saw that their first fans were now turning the games onto their children. In the last quarter of 2012, the 13-year-old Abe games sold 300,000 units (10% of what it sold in its entire run on PC and PS1) via digital distribution through word of mouth alone before any form of marketing.

Stranger's Wrath HD sold almost 250,000 units between December 2011 and October 2012 on the PlayStation 3, not including future sales on Steam, whereas the original Xbox version sold 600,000 units in its lifetime. By March 2014, the entire Oddworld portfolio sold two million units on the digital landscape. However, Gilray was acutely aware of how the huge gap in game production can affect Oddworld's ability to keep up with technology unavailable when they were making games. So when remastering Stranger and Munch, they included features like PlayStation Move, 3D support and online leaderboards.

The other new lesson to come from the current gaming landscape has been using analytics to understand the behavioral patterns of gamers. Lanning describes analytics as the new religion of the online space and believes the company that has the best learning engine for analytics is Zynga. While he may not like their games, "when you look at the science of how they are analysing what their audience is doing, there's a reason why they have 170 million users today—larger than the install-base of the entire console market".

Released titles
The developers originally stated that the Oddworld series would consist of five inter-connected games referred to as the Quintology. Only two of those five games have been produced, while two additional games from the same universe were developed as expansion titles outside of the Quintology. Production on the Quintology's final three games was halted when the company decided to redirect its efforts toward film production. Those plans, too, were shelved. In 2009, a partnership was created with developers Just Add Water to continue developing the abandoned video games with Oddworld Inhabitants Inc. becoming the publisher of the titles. In order to raise the money to fund the rest of the Quintology, Just Add Water began by porting the studio's first two titles to new consoles and producing high definition remasters of Oddworld: Munch's Oddysee and Stranger's Wrath. A high definition rebuild of Oddworld: Abe's Oddysee subtitled New 'n' Tasty! was next. Stewart Gilray has confirmed that all five Quintology games are titled Oddworld: X's Oddysee where X is the name of the protagonist.

Oddworld: Abe's Oddysee

The first game developed by Oddworld Inhabitants is 1997's Oddworld: Abe's Oddysee. Published by GT Interactive for PlayStation, DOS and Windows platforms, it is the first in their planned five-game Quintology of games set on the fictional planet of Oddworld. The game tells the story of Abe, a happy, ignorant factory worker and the destined savior of his mudokon race. Abe is a lowly floor waxer at RuptureFarms, a meat processing plant run by the evil glukkons on Oddworld's largest continent of Mudos. The plant makes sweet and savory treats by farming and slaughtering the wildlife that roam the rural areas surrounding the plant, and exploits 100 mudokons for slave labor to run their factory. When Abe discovers the glukkons' plan to increase their dwindling profits by using the mudokons in their new tasty treat, he vows to escape the plant and save his 99 friends. Along the way, he meets a spiritual guide that opens his mind to the mudokons' bond with nature and Abe's personal destiny to awaken the powerful mudokon gods and become the prophesied savior who would return his race to their sacred holy lands. The game is a side-scrolling 2D platformer with lifelike animation on top of photo-realistic backgrounds. Its revolutionary features included the ability to "chant" in order to possess and remotely control the bodies of Slig guards to solve puzzles or allow Abe to advance safely; and a feature called gamespeak, the ability for the player to engage in conversation with other mudokons to navigate them to safety. The game was later ported to Game Boy by Saffire under the title Oddworld Adventures.

Oddworld: Abe's Exoddus

Following the success of Abe's Oddysee, Oddworld temporarily shelved plans for the next game in their Quintology to produce an instant follow up that could capitalize on the popularity of the first game. The resultant spinoff game, Oddworld: Abe's Exoddus was released the following year in 1998, again published by GT Interactive for PlayStation and Windows platforms. A direct sequel to Oddysee, Exoddus begins immediately after Abe returns from RuptureFarms with his fellow mudokons, receiving a vision from the spirits of his ancestors. They plead for his help in stopping the glukkons from digging up mudokon bones to make the addictive Soulstorm Brew. Along the way, Abe rescues more of his mudokon race and learns more about their sacred history, living in harmony with nature and the wildlife. Coming so quickly after the previous game, Exoddus used Oddysees game engine, remaining a 2D side-scrolling platformer, albeit adding more, longer levels and extra features. Abe's abilities were expanded upon to include more communication options and wider chant abilities allowing the possession of other species. Mudokons were also further developed, now having moods that affect Abe's ability to communicate with them and enlist their co-operation.

Oddworld: Munch's Oddysee

Oddworld Inhabitants' third game, Oddworld: Munch's Oddysee was the second of their planned five-game Quintology series. Released in 2001 as a direct sequel to their two previous entries, the game was published by Microsoft Game Studios exclusively for the Xbox. Abe returns, but the game introduces a new protagonist in Munch, the last living remnant of the near-extinct, amphibious gabbit creatures. The story again involves Abe embarking on a quest to free the weak from the tyranny of the powerful capitalist creatures that exploit them for their own gain. Players assume the dual roles of Abe and Munch as they team up to escape the vicious Vykkers who harvested the gabbits in order to profit from their eggs—a delicacy on Oddworld—and ultimately destroy the Vykker's Labs. The game marks the series' introduction into 3D environments, though retaining its roots as a platformer. It is also the first game to introduce a second protagonist, allowing the player to switch between Abe and Munch to take advantage of abilities exclusive to each character. Also pivotal was the expansion of elements that were only touched on in their two previous games, such as the ability to "create characters and use them as allies to attack, defend and solve work problems in the world." Other changes include new chanting features, the ability for Abe to pick up objects or people, and power ups that affect gameplay.

Oddworld: Stranger's Wrath

Veering away from the Quintology a second time, Oddworld Inhabitants' fourth game was Oddworld: Stranger's Wrath, published for the Xbox in 2005 by Electronic Arts. The first Oddworld game to be entirely independent of the Abe series, Stranger's Wrath is set in the Wild West of Oddworld and follows a bounty hunter known only as the Stranger, one of the last remaining "steef" on Oddworld, as he collects bounties for capturing outlaws in order to save enough "moolah" for a life-saving operation. The game continues the 3D gameplay introduced by Munch's Oddysee and switches between first person perspective for shooting, and third person perspective for long range running, platform jumping and melee combat. It also moves away from Oddworld's reliance on puzzles in favor of an action-adventure style with elements of role playing. Its prominent new features included "live ammunition", where the player can use various in-game creatures and projectiles for differing effects; and the ability to use the game's money system to purchase various items and weapon upgrades.

Oddboxx
In 2009, Lorne Lanning announced plans to make an Oddworld digital download package exclusively for PC to contain Abe's Oddysee, Abe's Exoddus, and for the first time on the platform, Munch's Oddysee and Stranger's Wrath. When Oddworld Inhabitants unveiled their re-designed website on 4 November 2010, they declared the then in-development package would be titled Oddboxx. The European and U.S. prices of the Oddboxx were revealed on 14 December and on 20 December 2010, it was released on Steam. 30 Achievements were added to Munch's Oddysee, while Stranger's Wrath gained 20.

On 29 April 2011, Stewart Gilray announced at GameCityNights that they were planning an Oddboxx release for the PlayStation Network with the Stranger portion of the package to be the remastered edition they had been working on, though the release had been delayed to fix some bugs and add additional features like PlayStation Move and 3DTV support. The Oddboxx finally saw release on 6 November 2013 for the PlayStation 3 in the European and Australian markets, which included the HD remakes of Munch and Stranger along with original versions of Abe's Oddysee and Exoddus. But the studio is unable to release it to the North American market due to "technicalities regarding the product publisher code... on two of the titles" in the collection of four.

Abeboxx
To make up for Oddboxx not being released on the PlayStation 3 in the North American market, Oddworld Inhabitants released a mini collection entitled the Abeboxx, composed of original versions of Abe's Oddysee and Abe's Exoddus, to the PSN on 26 November 2013. It was subsequently released in Europe for PS3, PSP and PS Vita on 22 January 2014.

Oddworld: New 'n' Tasty!

The first game solely developed by Just Add Water and published by Oddworld Inhabitants, New 'n' Tasty! is a retelling of Abe's Oddysee with 2.5D visuals. The game remained a side-scrolling platformer, but has done away with the original's flip screen presentation in favour of smooth continuous scrolling and a dynamic camera for zooming in and out based on the movements of the player and the scenery. The story is completely identical to Oddysee and new FMV sequences have been added to recreations of the originals to further illustrate the plot. The soundtrack too has been recreated from scratch, with additional pieces added. New 'n' Tasty! debuted on PS4 in July 2014, as part of an exclusive release with Sony in exchange for giving Oddworld Inhabitants their own booth at E3 in 2013, and centre stage at Sony's 2013 E3 presentation. Versions for Linux, Microsoft Windows and OS X were released on 25 February 2015 while the Xbox One version was released on 27 March 2015. The PlayStation 3 version was released on 21 April 2015 and the PlayStation Vita version was released on 19 January 2016. The Wii U version was released on 11 February. The same day the Vita version was released, Oddworld Inhabitants and publisher Limited Run Games announced they would run a series of limited edition physical copies of New 'n' Tasty! for the Vita, marking the first physical copies of an Oddworld Inhabitants game since Stranger's Wrath released to the original Xbox in 2005.Limited Run Games (18 January 2016) "We've officially hit 3,000 followers! Oddworld: New N' Tasty is coming to physical media. Await further details from @OddworldInc!"  Twitter On 29 March 2016, Limited Run Games revealed there will also be a limited edition physical version for the PS4. On 14 December 2017, New 'n' Tasty! was released on iOS, Android and NVIDIA Shield.

HD remasters
On 3 September 2010, Just Add Water announced on their website that they had been working for nine months to bring a high definition remaster of Stranger's Wrath to the PlayStation Network as the beginning of an Oddworld revival. Talks with Microsoft in regards to an Xbox Live Arcade release were ongoing. The HD version of Stranger's Wrath was released to PS3 on 27 December 2011 and Steam on 9 September 2012 with upgraded features including 720p visuals, new character models and hidden unlockables. The game reached the top ten for the month of December 2011, despite only being released on 27 December. While the Xbox version was planned, it was officially cancelled on 21 June 2012, which Gilray then reiterated on 23 February 2013 when Stranger HD was finally completed. An update was released for the PS3 version in the European and Australian markets on 6 November 2013, which gave the game Leaderboards, 3D Stereoscopic TV and PlayStation Move support, along with reducing the file size by half. That update was also provided to the American territory on 12 February 2014, the same day that a Stranger's Wrath HD Demo was made available for the PS3 in all territories. On 11 August 2017, Oddworld Inhabitants released Stranger's Wrath for the Apple TV.

The PlayStation Vita port of Stranger was released on 18 December 2012. It reached the top of the sales charts in Europe for December and second in the US despite being released in the middle of the month.

The HD remaster of Munch's Oddysee was announced at GameCityNights on 29 April 2011 and released to PlayStation 3 on 19 December 2012 with upgrades similar to Stranger HD and 45 trophies. Improvements were made to GUI and front end. The Vita version of Munch HD was expected in the second quarter of 2013, but was halted during the final weeks of FQA testing when they discovered foreign language assets were missing. Stewart Gilray later explained that the missing foreign language assets delayed an update to trophies and graphical errors on the PS3 version, which needed to be released to all territories so that it could be applied to the Vita version. The game is now being translated in full to make up for the missing foreign dialogue. The game was released on 17 December 2014. It was also released for Mac through the App Store on 6 January 2016. A PC port is not in the works, but in discussions. However, on 25 February 2016, Oddworld Inhabitants revealed they are working with Square One Games on an updated port of Munch's Oddysee for the Steam platform that includes HD environment assets, though they stopped short of saying the entire game will be an HD remaster.

The HD remasters of Munch and Stranger were included with original versions of Abe's Oddysee and Exoddus in the PlayStation release of the Oddboxx on 6 November 2013 for European and Australian markets.

A PlayStation 4 version of Stranger HD with "new dynamics" has been mentioned, contingent on discussions about budget and schedules.

On 24 October 2016, Oddworld Inhabitants announced they have teamed with Limited Run Games to bring Stranger's Wrath HD to the PS Vita on a physical disc, their second such partnership with Limited Run Games, and only the second time they have published a game on disc since they became a self-publisher. The limited edition is set for release on 9 December 2016, and will come with a reversible cover, Stranger's Wrath-themed poker cards and a map of the in-game Mongo River.

On 9 February 2018, Oddworld Inhabitants revealed that Munch's Oddysee HD would be the third game they publish on disc since their turn into independent developing, and the third instance in their partnership with Limited Run Games. The game will be released for the PS Vita on 23 February 2018 in a single disc format and a collector's edition.

Other ports
Oddworld Inhabitants announced that Stranger's Wrath HD would be coming to mobile devices iOS and Android. Developed by Square One Games, the port consists mostly of the original Xbox version's assets, but will use some aspects from the recent HD updates as well. The iOS version was released on 27 November 2014, coming with fully configurable controls and brand new graphical features. The Android version was released on 8 December 2014.

Stranger's Wrath was released for Mac on 9 February 2015 through the App Store, including native Mac resolution (including 5K), iCloud integration to allow users to play and continue on their iOS-portable devices, fully remappable keyboard and mouse controls and gamepad support, Game Center achievements and leaderboards.

Stewart Gilray has hinted at porting Stranger's Wrath to PlayStation 4.

On 12 November 2015, Oddworld Inhabitants released Munch's Oddysee to iOS, with the Android release following on 28 November 2015.

On 11 August 2017 and 29 September 2017, Stranger's Wrath and Munch's Oddysee were released to the Apple TV.Oddworld Inhabitants (29 September 2017) [OddworldInc: Surprise (again!) – available now on Apple TV -> Oddworld: Munch's Oddysee! itunes.apple.com/us/app/oddworl… pic.twitter.com/YCE3S9UV5N ] Twitter

A Wii U version of Stranger's Wrath will be released, but the developers want to release New 'n' Tasty! on the platform first because Abe is a more Nintendo-friendly character and they expect Stranger's Wrath will alienate Nintendo gamers from the Oddworld universe if that is their first introduction to the franchise.

Oddworld: Soulstorm

On 14 April 2015, it was announced by Lanning that Abe's Exoddus would be getting a remake. Lanning said that Exoddus's success would contribute significantly to future Oddworld titles, and would be marketed more broadly than Oddworld: New 'n' Tasty!.'.

As of February 2016 in an interview with Lorne Lanning, he told NintendoLife that the remake is about to go into production.

In March 2016, it has been confirmed that Oddworld: Soulstorm would be the Abe's Exoddus remake. The game will be developed and published by Oddworld Inhabitants, Frima Studio and Fat Kraken Studios. The game is being developed on the Unity engine.

In an April 2016 interview with Game Informer, Lanning said that because Abe's Exoddus took only nine months to make, its script wasn't perfect for this remake. He explained that Exoddus is going to be the spine for Oddworld: Soulstorm which will be about Soulstorm Brewery and the brew, hoping the game would be finished for a late 2017 release.

In July 2016 in a podcast by Lorne Lanning, he said that the development of the game was going strong and a further announcement was due in the Fall of 2016. He said that the game is on target to be released in 2017 and it's going to be a platform-based game like New 'n' Tasty is. He also said that some Youtubers and their composer, Michael Bross will be doing some voice-over work for the game.

In September 2016 at the EGX Expo, Oddworld: New 'n' Tasty's designer Matt Glanville said that Oddworld: Soulstorm is going to be a bigger version of Abe's Exoddus. There will be some areas and game mechanics that were from Exoddus and some new areas from Oddworld. The Quarma system from Munch's Oddysee will return and the path that the player takes will depend on the storyline. He also stated that Oddworld: Soulstorm is a sequel to New 'n' Tasty.

On 27 April 2017, Lanning revealed the release date of the game had been revised to 2018.
Afterwards, the development team has moved the release date to 2019, and then again to 2020.

Prior to the Sony State of Play February 2021, Lanning revealed that the release date would not be announced during the State of Play, but by the end of the month.
On 25 February 2021, Lanning revealed the release date of Soulstorm April 6, 2021 for PS4, PS5 and the Epic Games Store. In addition, Soulstorm would be included in the PlayStation Plus lineup for the month of April 2021.

On March 26, 2021, Oddworld Inhabitants, Microids and Pix'n Love Publishing revealed the physical version of Oddworld: Soulstorm would release on July 6, 2021 for PS4 and PS5. In addition to a "Day-One" and "Collector's Edition" provided by publisher Microids and a collab with Pix'n Love Publishing. Limited to 100 copies only with exclusive signature from Lorne Lanning himself.

Upcoming titles

The Brutal Ballad of Fangus Klot

Originally coming from discussions about a sequel to Stranger's Wrath, The Brutal Ballad of Fangus Klot is a standalone game, independent of the Oddworld Quintology, originally announced in an April 2005 issue of Game Informer. The story is set in a rural land resembling Afghanistan far from the continent of Mudos where the first four Oddworld games were based, inspired by the "United States propaganda approach" of pretending to free the region, but really wanting to "rob it and slaughter it and leave it as rubble". The invaders are a foreign species resembling an Eastern European or "Russian mafia" whose genetics include traces of feline DNA. Fangus' history reveals canine DNA, allowing for Lanning's desire to "play off of that dog versus cat theme" that he's always wanted to visit—"one of those dynamic, eternal battles... myths that lie deep in our history of civilization... like good versus evil." The invaders have turned this "beautiful landscape into meth labs," "whilst the dogs find themselves fighting for scraps in a war-torn region." Fangus is a shepherd who is directly affected by the invasion, "finding out he's only got so long, and the circumstances that have [led] him to this position means he's going to have to fight, following a similar journey to that of the Roman general in Gladiator.

Oddworld Inhabitants delayed reacting to a rumor about the game which caused many to consider the development the playing of an April Fools' Day prank. In a June 2009 issue of Game Informer, Lorne Lanning officially spoke about the game, revealing concept art and story details, and plans to distribute the game digitally. A Mature rating by the ESRB was expected due to dark tones and themes throughout the game. Majesco Entertainment was expected to publish the game for the Xbox before it was canceled when they failed to come to agreements with Sherry McKenna and Lorne Lanning. In a 9 May 2011 FAQ, an Oddworld Inhabitants representative confirmed Fangus Klot will be in future plans following The Hand Of Odd and Oddworld: New 'n' Tasty! and Lanning further expressed his desire to make the game, though financing it is the obstacle.Lanning, L. (15 August 2013) "Cant... stop... thinking... Fangus.  He's a black hole relentlessly tugging my mind. dark, brutal, heart break.  Dammit. Just doesn't stop." Twitter The reluctance comes from it being an entirely untried IP that Lanning envisions costing $10M, which he says is not smart for an independent developer to take on at this stage of their success. Stewart Gilray has seen "an original Xbox build" of Fangus, which does run, but his company is no longer producing games for Oddworld Inhabitants. In March 2014, Lanning revealed he has been designing the game himself for a year and a half and that if New 'n' Tasty! sells 500,000 units, Oddworld Inhabitants would finance Fangus because he expects it to cost between 5–6 million dollars. On 12 August 2015, Lanning said that if there's any indication that a remake of Exoddus will garner the same returns as New 'n' Tasty! has, then a new IP would be made.

Oddworld: Hand of Odd

Hand of Odd was conceived as an online, open world, real-time strategy game during the production of Munch's Oddysee. Early information revealed its multiplayer aspects and its ability to be played from the perspective of Oddworld's peaceful mudokons or its greedy, corporate overlords, changing the aim and experiences of the game. Lanning wanted to create an RTS game that changed the previous model of two warring factions with the same goal of deforestation in order to build a militarised complex to overtake an opposition army. Instead, he wanted one of the two warring entities to be a native, shamanistic class "focused on life-force [that] gain power by growing back trees and restoring the environment," in keeping with his video game development MO of "the indigenous versus the industrial" to help people "understand real world problems in a world that (for everything other than its appearance) is very similar to ours." But with the release of sub-par RTS games, the market began losing faith in the genre. Soon after, Oddworld Inhabitants' publisher was acquired by a company known for risk-averse decisions, so Lanning decided to shelve the game after just preliminary design and development, because the odds were stacked against them, not because of the quality of the game he wanted to make. However, the work made on the pre-production of the game helped flesh out details of Oddworld that have helped them understand their universe for future games, and the early footage excited Gilray at the time. Ongoing downloadable content was being considered before the game was halted when the studio redirected its goals towards multimedia development. The game was thought to have been revived when Just Add Water announced plans for its development including launching a website with the original logo designed by Oddworld Inhabitants. Gilray said computers and tablets were the likely platform choices because strategy games and consoles don't mix, and because "it works well with touchscreen interface or mouse control". Just Add Water has seen "the original bound Hand of Odd design document" which is four inches thick and was originally made in the late 1990s. However, plans for the game are not known, as Just Add Water ended their partnership with Oddworld Inhabitants at the end of 2015.

Future

Given that Oddworld Inhabitants now owns every single element of the Oddworld franchise, and has provided Just Add Water with the full 15TB archive of original assets from Oddworld's time in game development, the team at Just Add Water have a backlog of games to make. It is Gilray's objective to focus on Hand of Odd, Squeek's Oddysee and then continue with more of the Oddworld universe in "rebuilding the Oddworld brand". According to the Oddworld timeline document Lanning gave to Gilray, the Oddworld planet's history has spanned two to three thousands years, while "the games so far have covered two, maybe three hundred years... so right now there is no end in sight. Our limit is what we do and when we do it." There are also many unseen creatures integral to future Oddworld stories that originally came from designs cut from previous games and are waiting to be revealed as Abe ventures closer to the center of the planet's consumerism. Gilray is also aware of a 'time encyclopaedia' written by Lanning that details a thousand years of the Oddworld planet's history, including other continents, species and civilisations only hinted at in previous games. Gilray said the next logical game to build would be a remake of Abe's Exoddus because it would use the same engine as New 'n' Tasty! and be quicker to produce than an entirely new game, though they are open to continuing with a new game because "Lanning's mind is already full of ideas." Lanning said in October that if they choose to focus on new content, that there are two possibilities on the table, stopping short of specifying what those games are because he does not want to make a promise and then fail to deliver, as he has done in the past.

Of his relationship to Just Add Water, Lanning said it is best "to empower people with a sense of responsibility and trust [but] when we get on to new content, there's a whole other level of discretion that will go beyond that and then we'll see if they like working with me." Lanning has explained that his role is not down in the trenches with the developers anymore because the templates and mechanics of the gameplay are done, and he trusts the developers at Just Add Water to use them in the construction of the game, but his input increases when new gameplay mechanics are developed, such as Stranger's Wrath's live ammo, or when they get close to shipping and he needs to inspect game controls. When he compares the relationship with Just Add Water to those his company had with publishers in the past, he feels their development team has a culture that can be nurtured better because the pressure to succeed is only coming from themselves, not an outside force they can't control, such as a publisher's demands and the risk of blowing a huge budget on lukewarm sales returns. Gilray says Lanning and Sherry McKenna are in constant communication with him, which assures him they still care about their brand. Though ultimately, they would all be waiting to see how well New 'n' Tasty! performs before making a decision. Lanning revealed they require 500,000 units of New 'n' Tasty! to sell in order to fund a new game, but only 250,000 had been sold to fund a new version of Exoddus, because he believes more money is spent on the research and development period in order to produce "new mechanics, getting something creative that's different," whereas a new version of Exoddus would use the mechanics and assets already created in the original game to use as a blueprint. Gilray said a committee begun working on the next game in the middle of summer, 2013.

In February 2013, Stewart Gilray said the Just Add Water team had expanded to include 22 staff, of which "a few" are from the original Oddworld Inhabitants development team headed by Lanning between 1997 and 2005. Just Add Water has a "rough plan for the next couple of years", and now that their team has expanded with their budgets increased due to the success of their games, it is Gilray's intention to "bridge that gap between the traditional definition of "indie" and "AAA" projects". Lanning says he has not been this excited about gaming in over a decade because of the combination of exciting Triple-A titles on next-gen consoles, the wider, creative innovations on the indie front, and the revisiting of old genres like 2D platforming that were lost many years earlier getting a fresh look with newer technology. He firmly believes that Oddworld must define creativity, and "the day that it's not defining that for the public, I think we've got major issues... we have to see that we're getting stale before our audience does." They are humbly building the risks and the scale of their games to get the company back onto that Triple-A playing field, the only difference being that they are self-financing the development instead of relying on a publisher to fund it, which creates an environment for the developers down in the trenches that doesn't leave them burning out with hard work and the stress of failure threatening their livelihoods. They are being careful with their business decisions to ensure that the brand is maintained. Lanning has considered "crowdfunding" options like Kickstarter to produce his game, but would prefer to fund them solely with the money made from his games, with a future goal to be producing Triple-A titles entirely self-funded.

Oddworld Inhabitants said that Munch will feature in all future Quintology games, and that while they are not planning on a new game centred on Abe, he will feature in a future game. The team is developing three more titles under the Unity engine.

Possible games

 SligStorm: Originally discussed during the development of Munch's Oddysee, this 2D platforming bonus game, in the same vein as Abe's Exoddus, was shelved due to the move from 2D platforming into 3D games. The player would assume the role of an albino slig living in Rupture Farms and being picked on by other sligs for being different, until he decides to turn against his kind and work on the inside to assist the escape of the mudokons by shooting other sligs. On 9 May 2011, an Oddworld Inhabitants representative released a list of FAQ answers in relation to future games, confirming Sligstorm will be worked on after "Abe HD" and "The Hand of Odd," which was echoed in July 2011 by a representative on the Oddworld Inhabitants Facebook page. Lanning believes the difficulty lies in making players sympathize with a slig as the hero of a game.
 Oddworld: Squeek's Oddysee: The third game in the original Quintology following the first two entries Abe's Oddysee and Munch's Oddysee. In a 9 May 2011 FAQ, an Oddworld Inhabitants representative confirmed Squeek's Oddysee is on the cards after The Hand of Odd, Abe HD, The Brutal Ballad of Fangus Klot and Sligstorm are released. Lanning indicated it had a "messed up story" and would take a lot of time and money.
 Oddworld: Munch's Exoddus: Expected to be a bonus game based on Munch's Oddysee outside of the original pentalogy, in the same way that Abe's Exoddus was to Abe's Oddysee, plans for Munch's Exoddus evolved to become Stranger's Wrath. It would have featured Munch traveling to a land named "Ma'Spa" to hatch the Gabbit eggs acquired from the original game. Oddworld Inhabitants confirmed the game is not currently in the works, but may be a possibility.
 Oddworld: Slave Circus: Lorne Lanning has revealed plans for a game entitled Oddworld: Slave Circus. "It is seriously whack. You start the game by buying a slave. Think Gladiators on Oddworld. Have done a tremendous amount of work on this and have never mentioned it. But it is in the coffer and there may be some light for it down the road. But has some other contingencies depending on it... It's insane. Hopefully not so insane it won't come to life."
 Stranger's Wrath 2: The first mention of a sequel to Stranger's Wrath came on 17 January 2013 when Oddworld Inhabitants posted on their a blog asking readers to vote on the preferred next title to be developed by Just Add Water—Stranger 2 being one of the options.
 Stranger Arena: A competitive multiplayer game in the Oddworld universe that utilised the mechanics established in Stranger's Wrath. Players would control multiple "Strangers" and battle head to head or in groups in multiplayer modes. Lanning envisioned it being a game changer for the multiplayer genre because players had the ability to shift between third-person and first-person, as in Stranger's Wrath, unlike other shooters like Halo and Call of Duty, allowing players a more strategic method of switching between third-person for melee and evasion abilities, or first-person for shooting. He also intended to include RTS aspects of defensive base building to combat players who focused on speed and accuracy. The game engine was initially built on the original Xbox system, and to port it over to a modern system like Unity would involve "re-architecting" that the developers cannot afford to risk time and money on at this stage.

Reception

Adventure Classic Gaming called Lanning "a legend in both the game and the film industries."

The Oddworld games have received more than 100 industry awards. Oddworld: Abe's Oddysee received more than 24 awards and three nominations from the Academy of Interactive Arts & Sciences over 1997 and 1998.

In 1998, Oddworld Inhabitants combined the FMV cutscenes from Exoddus and submitted them to the Academy of Motion Picture Arts and Sciences as Abe's Exoddus: The Movie for Oscar consideration in the Animated Short category. The short did not win the Oscar.

In 1998, footage from Abe's Oddysee and Abe's Exoddus was used in the music video for Get Freaky by German electro-dance music project Music Instructor. Footage from Munch's Oddysee along with new CG animations of Abe and Munch were used in the music video for a European song called 'Use Yur Imagination' in 2002.

In 2010, Game Informer included Oddworld on the list of ten gaming franchises that should be revived, specifically counting for the return of Abe.

Oddworld's mascot Abe was planned as DLC for the PlayStation 3's All-Stars Battle Royale, but was later cancelled.

Due to Stewart Gilray's crowdfunding support during the development of Thomas Was Alone, the creator named a game character after Abe from the Oddworld franchise.

Merchandise

Lanning hinted at plans to release a game that involved action figures from the Oddworld universe in a pamphlet released at E3 in 1999. Called Oddwars, Lanning still has all the material he created for the game and may release it in the future.

On 30 July 2007, the composer of Stranger's Wrath, Michael Bross, released a soundtrack of music from the game.

Oddworld Inhabitants, in conjunction with book publisher Ballistic Publishing, released The Art of Oddworld Inhabitants: The First Ten Years 1994 – 2004 in 2008, an art book featuring design concepts, paintings and in-game screenshots made between 1994 and 2004 during the development of Abe's Oddysee, Abe's Exoddus and Munch's Oddysee. The book came in four editions: hard cover, soft cover, leather-bound edition (limited to 1000 copies, each individually numbered and with a certificate of authenticity) and folio edition (limited to 100 copies, each individually numbered and with a certificate of authenticity).

On 9 November 2011, to promote the release of Stranger's Wrath HD, a LittleBigPlanet 2 costume was made available for purchase. An XMB Dynamic Theme of Stranger's Wrath was also released a few weeks later, followed by a LittleBigPlanet 2 costume of Munch on 30 November.

On 9 September 2011, clothing company Insert Coin announced they would be selling t-shirts from their website with Stranger's Wrath images to promote the impending release of the remastered game. Two different designs were manufactured based on locales within the game. Jonny Eveson has also released designs for an Oddworld-themed T-shirt based on Abe's Exoddus. The design came in three colors. Oddworld Inhabitants uploaded the design to Qwertee seeking votes from the public to have the design accepted and put up for sale and on 1 April, the design was successfully added and put on sale for 48 hours.

In January 2016, Oddworld Inhabitants teamed up with publisher Limited Run Games for a one-off special release of New 'n' Tasty! on physical media if the publisher could reach 3000 followers on Twitter. On 18 January, Limited Run Games reached that goal and confirmed New 'n' Tasty! would be released on disc for the PlayStation Vita. On 29 March 2016, Limited Run Games revealed there would also be a limited edition physical version for the PS4. On 24 October 2016, Oddworld Inhabitants announced their second partnership with Limited Run Games to bring Stranger's Wrath HD to disc for the Vita platform only. The game was released on 9 December. On 9 February 2018, Oddworld Inhabitants announced their third partnership with Limited Run Games to release Munch's Oddysee HD on disc for the PS Vita. The game has been released on 23 February.

References

External links
 Official homepage
 IGN OWI overview

American companies established in 1994
Companies based in Berkeley, California
Video game companies established in 1994
Oddworld
Video game development companies
Film production companies of the United States
Television production companies of the United States
1994 establishments in California
Mass media companies established in 1994
Companies based in San Luis Obispo County, California